= 2011–12 Manchester United F.C. season =

English football club season

Manchester United
2011–12 season
- Co-chairmen: Joel and Avram Glazer
- Manager: Sir Alex Ferguson
- Stadium: Old Trafford
- Premier League: 2nd
- FA Cup: Fourth round
- League Cup: Fifth round
- UEFA Champions League: Group stage
- UEFA Europa League: Round of 16
- Community Shield: Winners
- Top goalscorer: League: Wayne Rooney (27); All: Wayne Rooney (34)
- Highest home attendance: 75,627 (vs. Wolverhampton Wanderers, 10 December)
- Lowest home attendance: 52,624 (vs. Crystal Palace, 30 November)
- Average home league attendance: 75,387
Home colours	Away colours	Third colours

The 2011–12 season was Manchester United's 20th season in the Premier League, and their 37th consecutive season in the top-flight of English football. United were defending Premier League champions, and aimed for an unprecedented 20th league title this season. Furthermore, they were competing in the Champions League for a 16th successive season. In addition, they were competing in the domestic tournaments, the FA Cup and the League Cup.

Manchester United began the season with a 3–2 win over local rivals Manchester City in the Community Shield at Wembley on 7 August 2011.

They were, however, knocked out of the League Cup at the Fifth Round stage for the second successive season after losing 2–1 to Crystal Palace at Old Trafford on 30 November 2011.

On 7 December 2011, United lost 2–1 away to Basel, a result which saw them finish third in their Champions League group. This meant that they competed in the UEFA Europa League (formerly the UEFA Cup) for the first time since the 1995–96 season. However, they only made it as far as the Round of 16, falling to Athletic Bilbao 5–3 on aggregate.

On 4 January 2012 against Newcastle United, Ryan Giggs broke Sir Bobby Charlton's record for the most starts, the match being Giggs' 757th start.

On 28 January 2012, United were knocked out of the FA Cup in the Fourth Round after losing 2–1 against Liverpool at Anfield.

Going into the final day of the season, on 13 May 2012, United and their local rivals Manchester City were locked together on 86 points at the top of the table, but City led with an eight-goal advantage in goal difference, 63 to 55. United therefore needed to hope for a City slip up to win the title. They were on course to do this, as a Wayne Rooney goal helped United scrape a 1–0 win away at Sunderland, whilst City trailed 2–1 at home to Queens Park Rangers, a score that could potentially hand United their 20th title. However, two goals in stoppage time from Edin Džeko and Sergio Agüero gave City a 3–2 win, pipping United to the title on goal difference, 64 to 56. It was the first time in 23 years that the champions and the runners-up had finished level on points.

The season was the first since 1991–92 without Gary Neville and the first since 2004–05 without Edwin van der Sar, who both retired after the 2010–11 season.

== Pre-season and friendlies ==
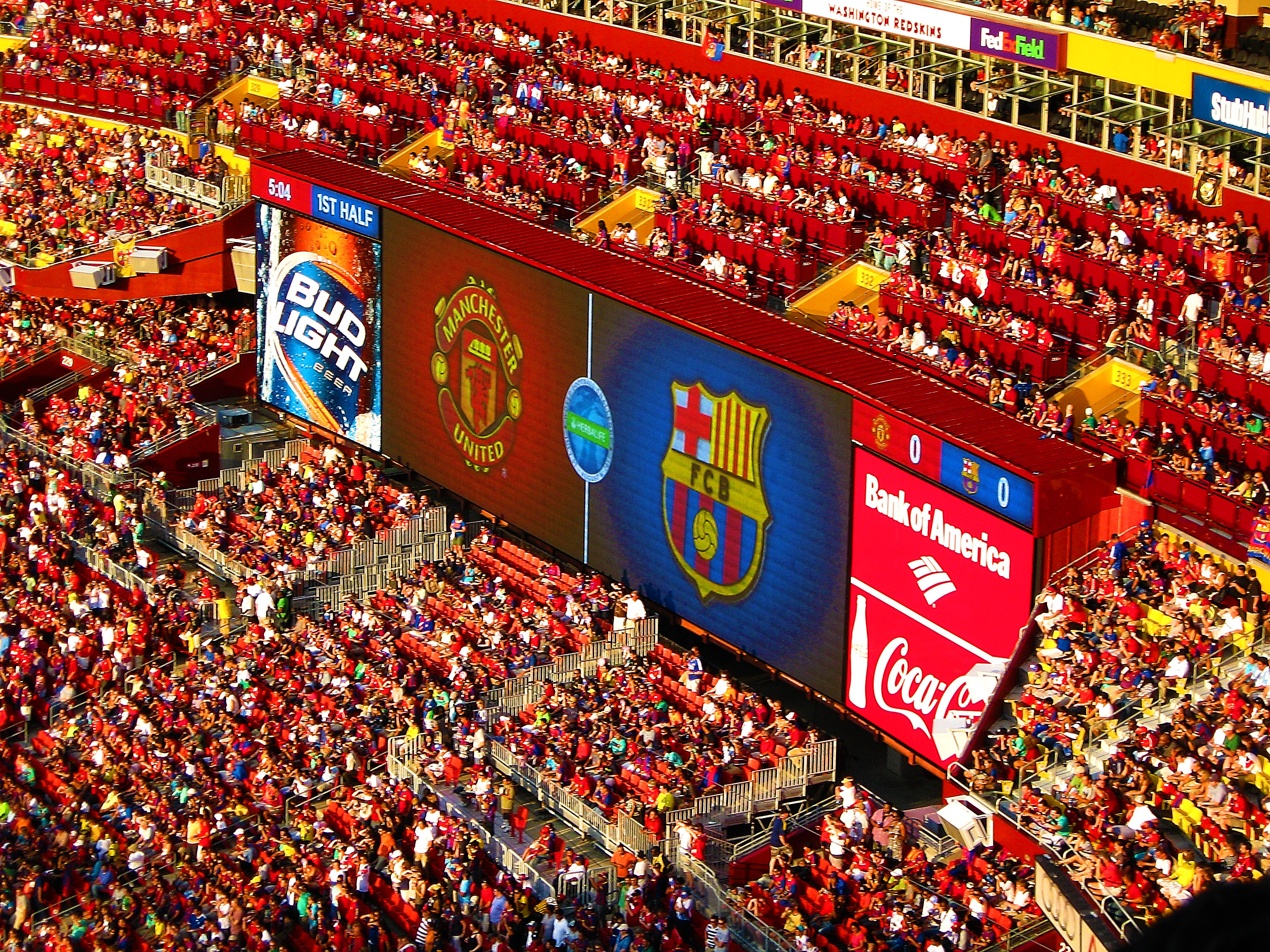
Scoreboard during United's pre-season game against Barcelona

Manchester United preceded their 2011–12 campaign with a tour of the United States for the second year in a row. As in 2010, they played in the MLS All-Star Game, in which they took on a team of the best players in Major League Soccer. In the lead-up to this game, which was played on 27 July 2011, United took on the New England Revolution (13 July), the Seattle Sounders (20 July) and the Chicago Fire (23 July), before finishing the tour with a game against Barcelona at FedExField in Washington, D.C., on 30 July.

The club granted a testimonial to Paul Scholes, who retired on 31 May 2011, to honour his 17 years of service to United. The match was played at Old Trafford against New York Cosmos on 5 August 2011. United won the game 6–0 – with Scholes himself opening the scoring the opening goal – to complete an unbeaten pre-season.

The club also granted a testimonial to Harry Gregg, a survivor of the 1958 Munich air disaster, who rescued a 20-month-old girl, her pregnant mother and attempted to revive United manager Sir Matt Busby. The match was played at Windsor Park against Irish League XI on 15 May 2012. The Irish XI was managed by Martin O'Neill and David Jeffrey. United won the game 4–1.

Date	Opponents	H / A	Result F–A	Scorers	Attendance
13 July 2011	New England Revolution	A	4–1	Owen 51', Macheda (2) 54', 60', Park 80'	51,523
20 July 2011	Seattle Sounders	A	7–0	Owen 15', Diouf 49', Rooney (3) 51', 69', 72', Park 71', Obertan 88'	67,052
23 July 2011	Chicago Fire	N	3–1	Rooney 66', Rafael 76', Nani 82'	61,308
27 July 2011	MLS All-Stars	N	4–0	Anderson 20', Park 45', Berbatov 52', Welbeck 68'	26,760
30 July 2011	Barcelona	N	2–1	Nani 22', Owen 76'	81,807
5 August 2011	New York Cosmos	H	6–0	Scholes 9', Rooney 28' (pen.), Anderson 50', Welbeck 59', Diouf (2) 69', 74'	74,731
15 May 2012	Irish League XI	N	4–1	Evra 20', Young (2) 58', 87', Rooney 64' (pen.)	14,098

== FA Community Shield ==
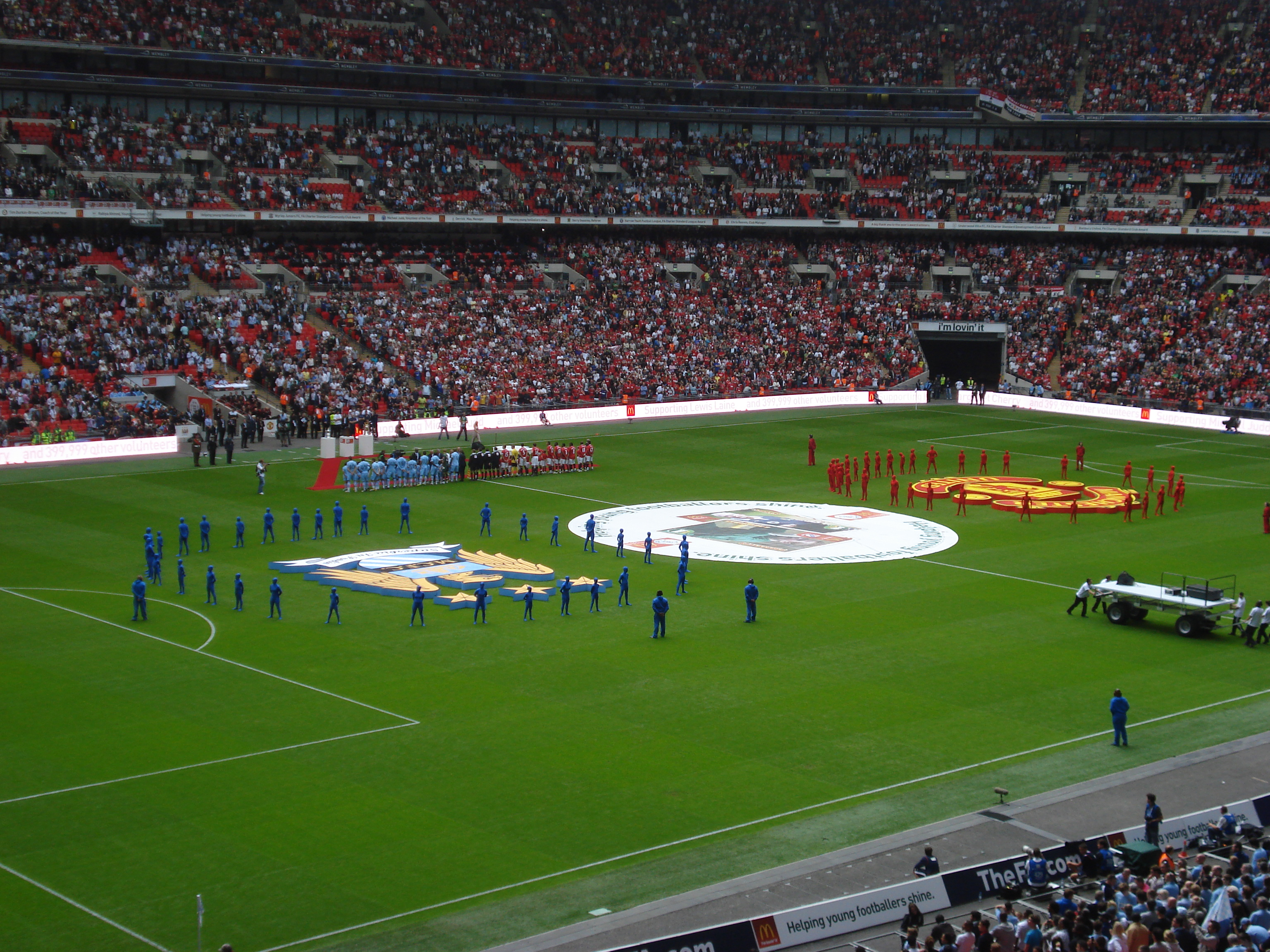
Teams lining up at Wembley prior to the match

As Premier League champions, United began the season against the holders of the FA Cup, local rivals Manchester City in the Community Shield. The match was played at Wembley on 7 August. This was the first time the Shield had been contested by the two clubs in 55 years. United had most of the possession and more shots on goal in the first half, but it was City who took the lead in the 38th minute when Joleon Lescott nodded in a David Silva free-kick. Edin Džeko then doubled City's lead on the stroke of half-time with a low strike from long-distance. However, seven minutes into the second half, Chris Smalling volleyed home an Ashley Young free-kick to reduce the deficit, and then Nani finished off an intricate passing move involving Wayne Rooney and Tom Cleverley in the 58th minute to bring the score back to 2–2. With a penalty shoot-out looming as the game moved into injury time, Nani forced a mistake from City captain Vincent Kompany, outpaced the defence and rounded goalkeeper Joe Hart before sliding the ball into the empty net to seal United's comeback and their 19th FA Community Shield.

Date	Opponents	H / A	Result F–A	Scorers	Attendance
7 August 2011	Manchester City	N	3–2	Smalling 52', Nani (2) 58', 90+4'	77,169

== Premier League ==
The fixtures for the 2011–12 league season were announced on 17 June, with United beginning the defence of their title away from home for the first time since 2005–06.

Date	Opponents	H / A	Result F–A	Scorers	Attendance	League position
14 August 2011	West Bromwich Albion	A	2–1	Rooney 13', Reid 81' (o.g.)	25,360	3rd
22 August 2011	Tottenham Hotspur	H	3–0	Welbeck 61', Anderson 76', Rooney 87'	75,498	2nd
28 August 2011	Arsenal	H	8–2	Welbeck 22', Young (2) 28', 90+1', Rooney (3) 41', 64', 82' (pen.), Nani 67', Park 70'	75,448	1st
10 September 2011	Bolton Wanderers	A	5–0	Hernández (2) 5', 58', Rooney (3) 20', 25', 68'	25,944	1st
18 September 2011	Chelsea	H	3–1	Smalling 8', Nani 37', Rooney 45'	75,455	1st
24 September 2011	Stoke City	A	1–1	Nani 27'	27,582	1st
1 October 2011	Norwich City	H	2–0	Anderson 68', Welbeck 87'	75,514	1st
15 October 2011	Liverpool	A	1–1	Hernández 81'	45,065	2nd
23 October 2011	Manchester City	H	1–6	Fletcher 81'	75,487	2nd
29 October 2011	Everton	A	1–0	Hernández 19'	35,494	2nd
5 November 2011	Sunderland	H	1–0	Brown 45+1' (o.g.)	75,570	2nd
19 November 2011	Swansea City	A	1–0	Hernández 11'	20,295	2nd
26 November 2011	Newcastle United	H	1–1	Hernández 49'	75,594	2nd
3 December 2011	Aston Villa	A	1–0	Jones 20'	40,053	2nd
10 December 2011	Wolverhampton Wanderers	H	4–1	Nani (2) 17', 56', Rooney (2) 27', 62'	75,627	2nd
18 December 2011	Queens Park Rangers	A	2–0	Rooney 1', Carrick 56'	18,033	2nd
21 December 2011	Fulham	A	5–0	Welbeck 5', Nani 28', Giggs 43', Rooney 88', Berbatov 90'	25,700	2nd
26 December 2011	Wigan Athletic	H	5–0	Park 8', Berbatov (3) 41', 58', 78' (pen.), Valencia 75'	75,183	2nd
31 December 2011	Blackburn Rovers	H	2–3	Berbatov (2) 52', 62'	75,146	2nd
4 January 2012	Newcastle United	A	0–3		52,299	2nd
14 January 2012	Bolton Wanderers	H	3–0	Scholes 45+1', Welbeck 74', Carrick 83'	75,444	2nd
22 January 2012	Arsenal	A	2–1	Valencia 45+1', Welbeck 81'	60,093	2nd
31 January 2012	Stoke City	H	2–0	Hernández 38' (pen.), Berbatov 53' (pen.)	74,719	2nd
5 February 2012	Chelsea	A	3–3	Rooney (2) 58' (pen.), 69' (pen.), Hernández 84'	41,668	2nd
11 February 2012	Liverpool	H	2–1	Rooney (2) 47', 50'	74,844	1st
26 February 2012	Norwich City	A	2–1	Scholes 7', Giggs 90+2'	26,811	2nd
4 March 2012	Tottenham Hotspur	A	3–1	Rooney 45', Young (2) 60', 69'	36,034	2nd
11 March 2012	West Bromwich Albion	H	2–0	Rooney (2) 35', 71' (pen.)	75,598	1st
18 March 2012	Wolverhampton Wanderers	A	5–0	Evans 21', Valencia 43', Welbeck 45+1', Hernández (2) 56', 61'	27,494	1st
26 March 2012	Fulham	H	1–0	Rooney 42'	75,570	1st
2 April 2012	Blackburn Rovers	A	2–0	Valencia 81', Young 86'	26,532	1st
8 April 2012	Queens Park Rangers	H	2–0	Rooney 15' (pen.), Scholes 68'	75,505	1st
11 April 2012	Wigan Athletic	A	0–1		18,115	1st
15 April 2012	Aston Villa	H	4–0	Rooney (2) 7' (pen.), 73', Welbeck 43', Nani 90+3'	75,138	1st
22 April 2012	Everton	H	4–4	Rooney (2) 41', 69', Welbeck 57', Nani 60'	75,522	1st
30 April 2012	Manchester City	A	0–1		47,259	2nd
6 May 2012	Swansea City	H	2–0	Scholes 28′, Young 41′	75,496	2nd
13 May 2012	Sunderland	A	1–0	Rooney 20'	46,452	2nd

Pos	Team	Pld	W	D	L	GF	GA	GD	Pts	Qualification or relegation
1	Manchester City (C)	38	28	5	5	93	29	+64	89	Qualification for the Champions League group stage
2	Manchester United	38	28	5	5	89	33	+56	89	Qualification for the Champions League group stage
3	Arsenal	38	21	7	10	74	49	+25	70	Qualification for the Champions League group stage
4	Tottenham Hotspur	38	20	9	9	66	41	+25	69	Qualification for the Europa League group stage (Note: Chelsea won the Champions League and thus qualified for the group stage as defending champions, forfeiting their spot in the Europa League as the FA Cup winners. This meant that Tottenham were to compete in the Europa League group stage, since, pursuant to the rules, only four clubs from the Premier League could play in the Champions League.)
5	Newcastle United	38	19	8	11	56	51	+5	65	Qualification for the Europa League play-off round

Source: Barclays Premier League
Rules for classification: 1) points; 2) goal difference; 3) number of goals scored.
(C) Champions

== FA Cup ==
United entered the FA Cup at the Third Round stage with the other Premier League clubs, as well as those from the Championship. The Third Round draw was made on 4 December 2011, and gave United an away match against holders Manchester City. The tie was played on 8 January 2012, and was the 162nd Manchester derby ending in a 3–2 win for United. The match saw the dramatic return of Manchester United legend Paul Scholes from his retirement after last season's Champions League Final against Barcelona. Two goals from Wayne Rooney and one from Danny Welbeck saw United go into the second half 3–0 up and a man up, Vincent Kompany having been sent off after 12 minutes of the first half. However, 10-man Manchester City bounced back immediately after the break with a free kick from Aleksandar Kolarov followed by a close-range goal from Sergio Agüero.

The draw for the Fourth Round took place on 8 January 2012, and gave United a tie against their other strong rivals Liverpool for the second successive season in the FA Cup. The match was played at Anfield on 28 January 2012. United lost 2–1. Daniel Agger's header put Liverpool in front, and Park Ji-sung equalised seven minutes before the break, but Dirk Kuyt's late winner ended United's hopes of winning the famous trophy. United had hit the post through Antonio Valencia in the first half. This loss meant that United still had not won the FA Cup since 2004, or even appeared in a final since 2007.

Date	Round	Opponents	H / A	Result F–A	Scorers	Attendance
8 January 2012	Round 3	Manchester City	A	3–2	Rooney (2) 10', 40', Welbeck 30'	46,808
28 January 2012	Round 4	Liverpool	A	1–2	Park 39'	43,952

== League Cup ==
As one of eight English clubs who qualified for European competition in the 2010–11 season, United received a bye to the Third Round of the League Cup. The draw took place on 27 August 2011, giving United a trip to Elland Road to take on fierce rivals Leeds United. The match took place on 20 September 2011, where United won 3–0. Sir Alex Ferguson handed a start to debutant Zeki Fryers, 18 years old, and twice early on, Dimitar Berbatov had to clear off the line. But that was the closest the hosts came to causing an upset, as Michael Owen opened the scoring on 15 minutes with a scuffed shot and lashed home a second on 32. Ryan Giggs all but sealed the victory when he played a short corner to Park Ji-sung, got the return ball, nutmegged Robert Snodgrass, and shot past Andrew Lonergan via a deflection off Luciano Becchio. Late on, Ramón Núñez, a Leeds substitute, fluffed the chance to score a consolation for Leeds, firing wide.

The draw for the Fourth Round took place on 24 September 2011, and gave United a trip to the EBB Stadium to take on League Two side Aldershot Town. The match was played on 25 October 2011, with United once again winning 3–0, through goals from Dimitar Berbatov, Michael Owen, and Antonio Valencia.

The draw for the quarter-finals took place on 29 October 2011, and gave United a home match against Championship side Crystal Palace. Crystal Palace took the lead in the 65th minute, with a 40-yard strike from Darren Ambrose. However, their lead lasted less than four minutes, with Federico Macheda equalising from the penalty spot, after he was fouled himself, in the 69th minute. Despite increasing Manchester United pressure, the match went to extra-time, where Crystal Palace scored a second, with a Glenn Murray header, to put them 2–1 ahead in the 98th minute. The game eventually ended 2–1, with Palace facing Cardiff City in the semi-finals, a game which secured a Championship side in the final.

Date	Round	Opponents	H / A	Result F–A	Scorers	Attendance
20 September 2011	Round 3	Leeds United	A	3–0	Owen (2) 15', 32', Giggs 45+1'	31,031
25 October 2011	Round 4	Aldershot Town	A	3–0	Berbatov 15', Owen 41', Valencia 48'	7,044
30 November 2011	Round 5	Crystal Palace	H	1–2 (a.e.t.)	Macheda 69' (pen.)	52,624

== UEFA Champions League ==
=== Group stage ===
Manchester United began their Champions League campaign in the group stage after finishing in first place in the 2010–11 Premier League. The draw for the group stage was made on 25 August 2011. As one of the top eight-ranked teams in Europe, the club was seeded in Pot 1, meaning that they would avoid being drawn with defending champions Barcelona, as well as Bayern Munich, Inter Milan, Porto, Real Madrid and the other three English clubs, Chelsea, Arsenal and Manchester City. The draw eventually paired United with two previous opponents, Benfica and Swiss champions Basel, and one new opponent, Romanian champions Oțelul Galați.

Benfica (14 September 2011)

United's first UEFA Champions League group game was away to Benfica on 14 September 2011, which ended in a 1–1 draw. Nicolás Gaitán's delightful long pass picked out Óscar Cardozo in the 24th minute, and he controlled on his chest then finished from 16 yards. But three minutes before half-time, Ryan Giggs cut inside from the right and fired a 20-yard strike to equalise. United goalkeeper Anders Lindegaard saved from Nolito and Gaitán late on.

Basel (27 September 2011)

United's next game in the Champions League was a home game against Basel. Two goals from Danny Welbeck in the 16th and 17th minutes looked to have put United in control. Welbeck's first goal came when he scuffed a shot in off the post, and the England forward's second was a far more convincing strike from Ryan Giggs' cross. Fabian Frei shot in off the post on 58 minutes to give Basel hope, and Alexander Frei's header, aided by awful defending from Rio Ferdinand, made it 2–2. With 15 minutes remaining, Basel were awarded a penalty and Alexander Frei sent David de Gea the wrong way to give Basel a shock lead and leave United on the brink of a first home defeat in almost 18 months. In the 90th minute, however, Ashley Young headed home Nani's cross at the back post to rescue a point. United could have earned all three points had substitute Dimitar Berbatov not shot into the side-netting rather than play it along the ground for a tap-in. Instead, United were forced to settle for a point, as they went down to third in Group C. This was the first time since 1999 that United had failed to win either of their first two Champions League group stage matches.

Oțelul Galați

United went on to win both their fixtures against Oțelul Galați 2–0, with two penalties, both scored by Wayne Rooney, leading United to victory away from home, and an early goal from Antonio Valencia and a late own goal from Cristian Sârghi to ensure a 2–0 United victory at Old Trafford.

Benfica (22 November 2011)

A 2–2 draw in Matchday 5 against Benfica followed. Phil Jones with an own goal put Benfica in front. Dimitar Berbatov in the 30th minute and Darren Fletcher in the 59th turned the tables, but Pablo Aimar's equaliser just two minutes later gave the final result.

Basel (7 December 2011)

However, an unlikely 2–1 away defeat against Basel meant that United failed to progress past the group stage of the Champions League for only the third time in 17 years. The starting position for both clubs on matchday 6 in the sold-out St. Jakob Park with 36,894 fans was clear. With Benfica already assured of progress to the knock-out stage, Basel and United went head-to-head for the second qualifying berth. United needed only a point and the hosts would only stay in the competition with a win. It was a cool evening and at times it rained after referee Björn Kuipers of the Royal Dutch Football Association blew his whistle for the kick-off. United started well their hopes were somewhat dashed as their defence failed to clear a Markus Steinhöfer's cross from the right. The ball went to the far side and Xherdan Shaqiri claimed it on the left and sent it hard and high back into the centre. Keeper David de Gea could not clear the ball far enough and Basel's captain Marco Streller slammed a fierce shot home to put the hosts a goal ahead after nine minutes. The early goal gave Basel an optimism and they played with a good momentum and they continued to press forwards. United struggled to control the Basel wingers Shaqiri to the right and Fabian Frei on the left. As the game commenced Nani became equally influential for the visitors. After 30 minutes he brought a good cross to the middle but both Rooney and Park Ji-Sung were unable to reach it. A few minutes later Nani's own effort was bravely smothered by keeper Yann Sommer. Rooney had a second chance a few minutes later but the Basel keeper was equal to that too. United began the second half positively, but their increasing frustration was becoming obvious. All the more so, then as while trying to make a clearance, right-back Steinhöfer volleyed the ball against his own crossbar. Steinhöfer came away laughing and within minutes the Basel fans created a song to celebrate his feat. Basel created chances for themselves, Alexander Frei had one kick acrobatically saved. Then another counter-attack and Shaqiri played a neat cross from the right, Streller dummied by striding under the ball and Alexander Frei was there to head it home at the far post, with six minutes of play left. Although Phil Jones headed the ball home after Macheda's shot had rebounded off the cross-bar, Basel survived a tense final two minutes to advance to the knock-out phase with the 2–1 win.

Conclusion

According to football finance blogger Andy Green (a.k.a. "andersred"), United's failure to progress beyond the group stage of the Champions League could cost them up to £20 million, mostly in lost TV revenue. In the knockout phase Basel were drawn against Bayern Munich and were defeated 7–1 on aggregate. Bayern, in their turn advanced as far as the final. But here they were defeated by Chelsea after a penalty shoot-out.

Date	Opponents	H / A	Result F–A	Scorers	Attendance	Group position
14 September 2011	Benfica	A	1–1	Giggs 42'	63,822	2nd
27 September 2011	Basel	H	3–3	Welbeck (2) 16', 17', Young 90'	73,115	3rd
18 October 2011	Oțelul Galați	A	2–0	Rooney (2) 64' (pen.), 90+2' (pen.)	28,047	2nd
2 November 2011	Oțelul Galați	H	2–0	Valencia 8', Sârghi 87' (o.g.)	74,847	1st
22 November 2011	Benfica	H	2–2	Berbatov 30', Fletcher 59'	74,873	2nd
7 December 2011	Basel	A	1–2	Jones 89'	36,894	3rd

Team	Pld	W	D	L	GF	GA	GD	Pts
(Portugal) Benfica	6	3	3	0	8	4	+4	12
(Switzerland) Basel	6	3	2	1	11	10	+1	11
(England) Manchester United	6	2	3	1	11	8	+3	9
(Romania) Oțelul Galați	6	0	0	6	3	11	−8	0

== UEFA Europa League ==
As a result of finishing third in their group, United played in the UEFA Europa League for the first time since the 1995–96 season. They entered the tournament at the Round of 32 stage.

As one of the top four of the eight third-placed Champions League teams, United were seeded for the Round of 32 draw which took place at 12:00 GMT on 16 December 2011. United were drawn against Ajax. The only previous meeting between the two sides came in the 1st Round of the same competition in the 1976–77 season, United winning 2–1 on aggregate.

United were away from home for the first leg on 16 February 2012. United won the game 2–0. United struggled to get going in the first half, and David de Gea produced a brilliant save to deny Siem de Jong. But the Red Devils looked far stronger after the break, and Ashley Young put them ahead with a drilled finish. Javier Hernández doubled the lead late on to ensure that United took two away goals with them into the second leg at Old Trafford.

The return leg was at Old Trafford on 23 February 2012. United lost 2–1 (their fourth home loss of the season, having lost none at home the previous season), but went through 3–2 on aggregate. The Red Devils took the lead through Javier Hernández's finish following Dimitar Berbatov's fine pass. Aras Özbiliz levelled for Ajax from 20 yards. Toby Alderweireld headed home the winner with three minutes to go, but the goal came too late.

United were drawn with Athletic Bilbao in the Round of 16, after the Spanish side defeated Lokomotiv Moscow on away goals after a 2–2 aggregate draw in their Round of 32 tie.

United had only met Athletic Bilbao once before, in their debut season in European football. They met in the quarter-finals of the European Cup in the 1956–57 season. Matt Busby's babes lost 5–3 in Spain, before winning 3–0 at Maine Road – Old Trafford was not equipped with floodlights at that time – to progress 6–5 on aggregate. The second leg was played on 6 February 1957, and the majority of the players who played that day would perish exactly a year later in the Munich air disaster.

The first leg of the tie against Athletic Bilbao ended in a 3–2 defeat for United at Old Trafford on 8 March 2012. Wayne Rooney smashed United ahead from close range, before Fernando Llorente's header drew the visitors level. But the cavalier Spaniards refused to settle for a draw, as United failed to win yet another European home game. The hosts were stunned by two controversial second-half goals from Óscar de Marcos – who appeared to be offside from Ander Herrera's lofted pass – and Iker Muniain – whose goal resulted from a free-kick awarded after Patrice Evra kicked the ball with only one boot on – before a late consolation by Rooney from the penalty spot softened the blow as United succumbed to their fifth home defeat of the season.

United travelled to the San Mamés Stadium for the second leg of tie, on 15 March 2012. Having lost the first leg, United needed to win at least 2–0 to progress. However, United lost 2–1 on the night and 5–3 on aggregate, meaning that they tumbled out of Europe. Iker Muniain hit the post, before Fernando Llorente scored with a volley from Fernando Amorebieta's raking diagonal pass. Ryan Giggs then headed wide, but Óscar de Marcos put further daylight between the sides when he crashed in. Wayne Rooney scored from 25 yards late on, but it was merely a consolation.

Date	Round	Opponents	H / A	Result F–A	Scorers	Attendance
16 February 2012	Round of 32; First leg	Ajax	A	2–0	Young 59', Hernández 85'	48,866
23 February 2012	Round of 32; Second leg	Ajax	H	1–2	Hernández 6'	67,328
8 March 2012	Round of 16; First leg	Athletic Bilbao	H	2–3	Rooney (2) 22', 90+2' (pen.)	59,265
15 March 2012	Round of 16; Second leg	Athletic Bilbao	A	1–2	Rooney 80'	40,000

== Squad statistics ==
No.	Pos.	Name	League		FA Cup		League Cup		Europe		Other		Total		Discipline	
No.	Pos.	Name	Apps	Goals	Apps	Goals	Apps	Goals	Apps	Goals	Apps	Goals	Apps	Goals	Yellow card	Red card
1	GK	(Spain) David de Gea	29	0	1	0	0	0	8	0	1	0	39	0	0	0
3	DF	(France) Patrice Evra	37	0	2	0	0	0	7	0	1	0	47	0	9	0
4	DF	(England) Phil Jones	25(4)	1	1	0	1	0	7(2)	1	0(1)	0	34(7)	2	6	0
5	DF	(England) Rio Ferdinand	29(1)	0	1	0	0	0	6	0	1	0	37(1)	0	5	0
6	DF	(Northern Ireland) Jonny Evans	28(1)	1	1	0	1	0	5(3)	0	0(1)	0	35(5)	1	8	1
7	FW	(England) Michael Owen	0(1)	0	0	0	2	3	1	0	0	0	3(1)	3	0	0
8	MF	(Brazil) Anderson	8(2)	2	0(1)	0	0	0	3(1)	0	1	0	12(4)	2	2	0
9	FW	(Bulgaria) Dimitar Berbatov	5(7)	7	0(1)	0	3	1	3(1)	1	0(1)	0	11(10)	9	0	0
10	FW	(England) Wayne Rooney	32(2)	27	1	2	0	0	7	5	1	0	41(2)	34	3	0
11	MF	(Wales) Ryan Giggs	14(11)	2	2	0	1	1	5	1	0	0	22(11)	4	3	0
12	DF	(England) Chris Smalling	14(5)	1	2	0	1	0	5(2)	0	1	1	23(7)	2	1	0
13	MF	(South Korea) Park Ji-sung	10(7)	2	1	1	3	0	5(2)	0	0	0	19(9)	3	0	0
14	FW	(Mexico) Javier Hernández	18(10)	10	0(1)	0	0	0	4(3)	2	0	0	22(14)	12	0	0
15	DF	(Serbia) Nemanja Vidić (c)	6	0	0	0	1	0	2	0	1	0	10	0	1	1
16	MF	(England) Michael Carrick	27(3)	2	2	0	1	0	6(1)	0	1	0	37(4)	2	7	0
17	MF	(Portugal) Nani	24(5)	8	1	0	0	0	6(3)	0	1	2	32(8)	10	3	0
18	MF	(England) Ashley Young	19(6)	6	0	0	0	0	7	2	1	0	27(6)	8	4	0
19	FW	(England) Danny Welbeck	23(7)	9	2	1	0(1)	0	1(4)	2	1	0	27(12)	12	2	0
20	DF	(Brazil) Fábio	2(3)	0	0	0	3	0	7	0	0	0	12(3)	0	4	0
21	DF	(Brazil) Rafael	10(2)	0	1	0	1	0	3	0	0(1)	0	15(3)	0	5	0
22	MF	(England) Paul Scholes	14(3)	4	1(1)	0	0	0	0(2)	0	0	0	15(6)	4	3	0
23	MF	(England) Tom Cleverley	5(5)	0	0	0	1	0	3	0	0(1)	0	9(6)	0	0	0
24	MF	(Scotland) Darren Fletcher	7(1)	1	0	0	0	0	2	1	0	0	9(1)	2	2	0
25	MF	(Ecuador) Antonio Valencia	22(5)	4	2	0	3	1	5(1)	1	0	0	32(6)	6	3	0
26	MF	(France) Gabriel Obertan	0	0	0	0	0	0	0	0	0	0	0	0	0	0
27	FW	(Italy) Federico Macheda	0(3)	0	0	0	2	1	0(1)	0	0	0	2(4)	1	0	0
28	MF	(Republic of Ireland) Darron Gibson	1	0	0	0	1	0	0	0	0	0	2	0	1	0
29	GK	(Poland) Tomasz Kuszczak	0	0	0	0	0	0	0	0	0	0	0	0	0	0
30	DF	(Belgium) Ritchie De Laet	0	0	0	0	0	0	0	0	0	0	0	0	0	0
32	FW	(Senegal) Mame Biram Diouf	0	0	0	0	3	0	0	0	0	0	3	0	1	0
33	FW	(Portugal) Bebé	0	0	0	0	0	0	0	0	0	0	0	0	0	0
34	GK	(Denmark) Anders Lindegaard	8	0	1	0	0	0	2	0	0	0	11	0	0	0
35	DF	(England) Reece Brown	0	0	0	0	0	0	0	0	0	0	0	0	0	0
36	DF	(Belgium) Marnick Vermijl	0	0	0	0	0	0	0	0	0	0	0	0	0	0
37	MF	(Republic of Ireland) Robbie Brady	0	0	0	0	0	0	0	0	0	0	0	0	0	0
38	DF	(Republic of Ireland) Michael Keane	0	0	0	0	0(1)	0	0	0	0	0	0(1)	0	0	0
39	DF	(England) Tom Thorpe	0	0	0	0	0	0	0	0	0	0	0	0	0	0
40	GK	(England) Ben Amos	1	0	0	0	3	0	0	0	0	0	4	0	0	0
41	FW	(Norway) Joshua King	0	0	0	0	0	0	0	0	0	0	0	0	0	0
42	MF	(France) Paul Pogba	0(3)	0	0	0	0(3)	0	0(1)	0	0	0	0(7)	0	1	0
43	MF	(England) Matty James	0	0	0	0	0	0	0	0	0	0	0	0	0	0
44	DF	(Republic of Ireland) Sean McGinty	0	0	0	0	0	0	0	0	0	0	0	0	0	0
45	MF	(Italy) Davide Petrucci	0	0	0	0	0	0	0	0	0	0	0	0	0	0
46	MF	(England) Ryan Tunnicliffe	0	0	0	0	0	0	0	0	0	0	0	0	0	0
47	MF	(Northern Ireland) Oliver Norwood	0	0	0	0	0	0	0	0	0	0	0	0	0	0
48	FW	(England) Will Keane	0(1)	0	0	0	0	0	0	0	0	0	0(1)	0	0	0
49	MF	(England) Ravel Morrison	0	0	0	0	0(2)	0	0	0	0	0	0(2)	0	0	0
50	GK	(England) Sam Johnstone	0	0	0	0	0	0	0	0	0	0	0	0	0	0
51	DF	(England) Zeki Fryers	0(2)	0	0	0	2(1)	0	0(1)	0	0	0	2(4)	0	0	0
52	MF	(England) Larnell Cole	0	0	0	0	0(1)	0	0	0	0	0	0(1)	0	0	0
53	MF	(England) Jesse Lingard	0	0	0	0	0	0	0	0	0	0	0	0	0	0
Own goals			–	2	–	0	–	0	–	1	–	0	–	3	–	–

== Transfers ==
Manchester United's first two departures of the 2011–12 off-season were Dutch goalkeeper Edwin van der Sar and English midfielder Paul Scholes, who both retired shortly after the end of the 2010–11 season. On 1 July, three players were released by the club: English midfielder Owen Hargreaves, Northern Irish goalkeeper Conor Devlin and English defender Oliver Gill. Four days later, Nicky Ajose was allowed to move to Peterborough United for an undisclosed fee. He was followed two days later by veteran defenders Wes Brown and John O'Shea, who were both offered four-year contracts at Sunderland. The final departure of the summer was French forward Gabriel Obertan, who signed a five-year contract with Newcastle United after the clubs agreed an undisclosed fee.

The club's first signing of the summer came on 13 June 2011 in the form of Blackburn Rovers centre-back Phil Jones. He was followed ten days later by Aston Villa winger Ashley Young. But with the departure of Van der Sar, the club needed a long-term replacement for him in goal, and a deal was done to sign young Spanish goalkeeper David de Gea from Atlético Madrid. Unlike Van der Sar, however, Paul Scholes' retirement was not permanent, and he returned to the club in January 2012 to alleviate the club's injury crisis. The only other arrival in January was young Swiss defender Frédéric Veseli, signed from cross-town rivals Manchester City.

Four players left Manchester United during the January transfer window. First to depart was Irish midfielder Darron Gibson who signed for Everton for an undisclosed fee on 13 January. A week later, after spending the first half of the season on loan to Barnsley, Danny Drinkwater was bought by Leicester City also for an undisclosed fee. The last two players to leave were Mame Biram Diouf, who joined Hannover 96 on 28 January, and Ravel Morrison, who made a deadline day move to West Ham United. Italian defender Alberto Massacci was released from his contract on 23 April.

=== In ===
Date	Pos.	Name	From	Fee
8 January 2012	MF	(England) Paul Scholes	Unattached	Free
31 January 2012	DF	(Switzerland) Frédéric Veseli	(England) Manchester City	Undisclosed

=== Out ===
Date	Pos.	Name	To	Fee
1 July 2011	GK	(Northern Ireland) Conor Devlin	(England) Brentford	Free
1 July 2011	DF	(England) Oliver Gill	Retired	
5 July 2011	FW	(England) Nicky Ajose	(England) Peterborough United	Undisclosed
7 July 2011	DF	(England) Wes Brown	(England) Sunderland	Undisclosed
7 July 2011	DF	(Republic of Ireland) John O'Shea	(England) Sunderland	Undisclosed
9 August 2011	FW	(France) Gabriel Obertan	(England) Newcastle United	Undisclosed
31 August 2011	MF	(England) Owen Hargreaves	(England) Manchester City	Free
13 January 2012	MF	(Republic of Ireland) Darron Gibson	(England) Everton	Undisclosed
20 January 2012	MF	(England) Danny Drinkwater	(England) Leicester City	Undisclosed
28 January 2012	FW	(Senegal) Mame Biram Diouf	(Germany) Hannover 96	Undisclosed
31 January 2012	MF	(England) Ravel Morrison	(England) West Ham United	Undisclosed
23 April 2012	DF	(Italy) Alberto Massacci	Released	
15 May 2012	DF	(Belgium) Ritchie De Laet	(England) Leicester City	Undisclosed
15 May 2012	MF	(England) Matty James	(England) Leicester City	Undisclosed

=== Loan out ===
Date from	Date to	Pos.	Name	To
16 June 2011	30 June 2012	FW	(Portugal) Bebé	(Turkey) Beşiktaş
17 June 2011	18 January 2012	DF	(Belgium) Ritchie De Laet	(England) Norwich City
1 July 2011	29 February 2012	MF	(England) Ryan Tunnicliffe	(England) Peterborough United
1 July 2011	23 January 2012	DF	(England) Scott Wootton	(England) Peterborough United
19 July 2011	30 June 2012	MF	(Republic of Ireland) Robbie Brady	(England) Hull City
2 August 2011	4 January 2012	FW	(Norway) Joshua King	(Germany) Borussia Mönchengladbach
16 August 2011	10 September 2011	DF	(England) Reece Brown	(England) Doncaster Rovers
23 August 2011	19 January 2012	MF	(England) Danny Drinkwater	(England) Barnsley
24 August 2011	2 January 2012	MF	(Northern Ireland) Oliver Norwood	(England) Scunthorpe United
31 August 2011	30 June 2012	MF	(Brazil) Gladestony	(Netherlands) Twente
9 September 2011	10 January 2012	GK	(England) Sam Johnstone	(England) Scunthorpe United
2 January 2012	30 June 2012	FW	(Italy) Federico Macheda	(England) Queens Park Rangers
13 January 2012	30 June 2012	FW	(England) John Cofie	(Belgium) Royal Antwerp
16 January 2012	30 June 2012	FW	(Norway) Joshua King	(England) Hull City
31 January 2012	30 June 2012	DF	(England) Scott Wootton	(England) Nottingham Forest
31 January 2012	30 June 2012	MF	(Northern Ireland) Oliver Norwood	(England) Coventry City
21 February 2012	30 June 2012	GK	(Poland) Tomasz Kuszczak	(England) Watford
27 February 2012	12 March 2012	DF	(Republic of Ireland) Sean McGinty	(England) Morecambe
2 March 2012	5 May 2012	DF	(England) Reece Brown	(England) Oldham Athletic
