= 2010 FA Community Shield =

- The match programme cover
Chelsea	Manchester United
1	3
- Date: 8 August 2010
- Venue: Wembley Stadium, London
- Man of the Match: Paul Scholes (Manchester United)
- Referee: Andre Marriner (West Midlands)
- Attendance: 84,623
- Weather: Clear; 25 °C (77 °F)

The 2010 FA Community Shield (also known as The FA Community Shield sponsored by McDonald's for sponsorship reasons) was the 88th FA Community Shield, an annual football match contested by the winners of the previous season's Premier League and FA Cup competitions. A rematch of the previous year's FA Community Shield, the match was played at Wembley Stadium, London, on 8 August 2010, and contested by league and cup double winners Chelsea and league runners-up Manchester United. Manchester United won the match 3–1 with goals from Antonio Valencia, Javier Hernández and Dimitar Berbatov; Chelsea's consolation goal came from Salomon Kalou. It was Manchester United's 14th outright victory in the Community Shield.

Chelsea went into the match as trophy-holders, having won the 2009 edition. The Shield is usually contested by the winners of the Premier League and the FA Cup, but since Chelsea won the double, Manchester United qualified by default as Premier League runners-up. It was the third time in four years that the Community Shield had been contested between the two teams, having also met in 2007.

== Match details ==
8 August 2010
15:00 BST

Chelsea	1–3	Manchester United
Kalou 83'	Report	Valencia 41'; Hernández 76'; Berbatov 90+2'

Wembley Stadium, London
Attendance: 84,623
Referee: Andre Marriner (West Midlands)

Chelsea	Manchester United

GK	40	(Portugal) Hilário
RB	19	(Portugal) Paulo Ferreira	(substituted off) 79'
CB	2	(Serbia) Branislav Ivanović
CB	26	(England) John Terry (c)
LB	3	(England) Ashley Cole	(substituted off) 79'
DM	12	(Nigeria) Mikel John Obi	(substituted off) 60'
CM	5	(Ghana) Michael Essien
CM	8	(England) Frank Lampard
RW	21	(Ivory Coast) Salomon Kalou
LW	15	(France) Florent Malouda	(substituted off) 73'
CF	39	(France) Nicolas Anelka	(substituted off) 60'
Substitutes:
GK	22	(England) Ross Turnbull
DF	38	(Netherlands) Patrick van Aanholt
DF	43	(Netherlands) Jeffrey Bruma	(substituted on) 79'
MF	10	(Israel) Yossi Benayoun	(substituted on) 73'
MF	18	(Russia) Yuri Zhirkov	(substituted on) 79'
FW	11	(Ivory Coast) Didier Drogba	(substituted on) 60'
FW	23	(England) Daniel Sturridge	(substituted on) 60'
Manager:
(Italy) Carlo Ancelotti

GK	1	(Netherlands) Edwin van der Sar
RB	22	(Republic of Ireland) John O'Shea
CB	23	(Northern Ireland) Jonny Evans
CB	15	(Serbia) Nemanja Vidić (c)
LB	20	(Brazil) Fabio	(substituted off) 72'
RM	25	(Ecuador) Antonio Valencia
CM	16	(England) Michael Carrick	(substituted off) 79'
CM	18	(England) Paul Scholes	(substituted off) 79'
LM	13	(South Korea) Park Ji-sung	(substituted off) 45'
CF	10	(England) Wayne Rooney	(substituted off) 45'
CF	7	(England) Michael Owen	(substituted off) 45'
Substitutes:
GK	29	(Poland) Tomasz Kuszczak
DF	12	(England) Chris Smalling	(substituted on) 72'
MF	11	(Wales) Ryan Giggs	(substituted on) 79'
MF	17	(Portugal) Nani	(substituted on) 45'
MF	24	(Scotland) Darren Fletcher	(substituted on) 79'
FW	9	(Bulgaria) Dimitar Berbatov	(substituted on) 45'
FW	14	(Mexico) Javier Hernández	(substituted on) 45'
Manager:
(Scotland) Sir Alex Ferguson

Match officials

- Assistant referees:
  - Jake Collin (Merseyside)
  - Adam Watts (Worcestershire)
- Fourth official: Mike Jones (Cheshire)
- Reserve official: Simon Long (Suffolk)

Match rules

- 90 minutes.
- Penalty shoot-out if scores level after 90 minutes.
- Seven named substitutes.
- Maximum of six substitutions.

== See also ==
- 2009–10 Premier League
- 2009–10 FA Cup
