= Éder Valencia =

Ecuadorian footballer (born 1982)

Luis Éder Valencia
Personal information
- Full name: Luis Éder Valencia Mosquera
- Date of birth: 4 April 1982 (age 44)
- Place of birth: Lago Agrio, Ecuador
- Position: Midfielder

Team information
- Current team: Manta
- Number: 17

Senior career*
Years	Team	Apps	(Gls)
2004	El Nacional	1	(0)
2005	Macará (loan)	15	(2)
2005	El Nacional	3	(0)
2006	Universidad Católica	14	(0)
2006	Deportivo Azogues (loan)	1	(0)
2007	Universidad Católica	25	(1)
2008–2009	Olmedo	51	(1)
2010	Independiente José Terán	33	(1)
2011	Rocafuerte (loan)	12	(0)
2011	Independiente José Terán	2	(0)
2012	Manta	32	(0)
- * Club domestic league appearances and goals as of 21:19, 8 May 2011 (UTC) ‡ National team caps and goals as of 20:17, 26 March 2010 (UTC)

Luis Éder Valencia Mosquera (born 4 April 1982), commonly known as Éder Valencia, is an Ecuadorian footballer who last played as a midfielder for Manta.

== Personal life ==
He is the older brother of Ecuador national team player Antonio Valencia.
