= Antonio Valencia =

Ecuadorian footballer (born 1985)

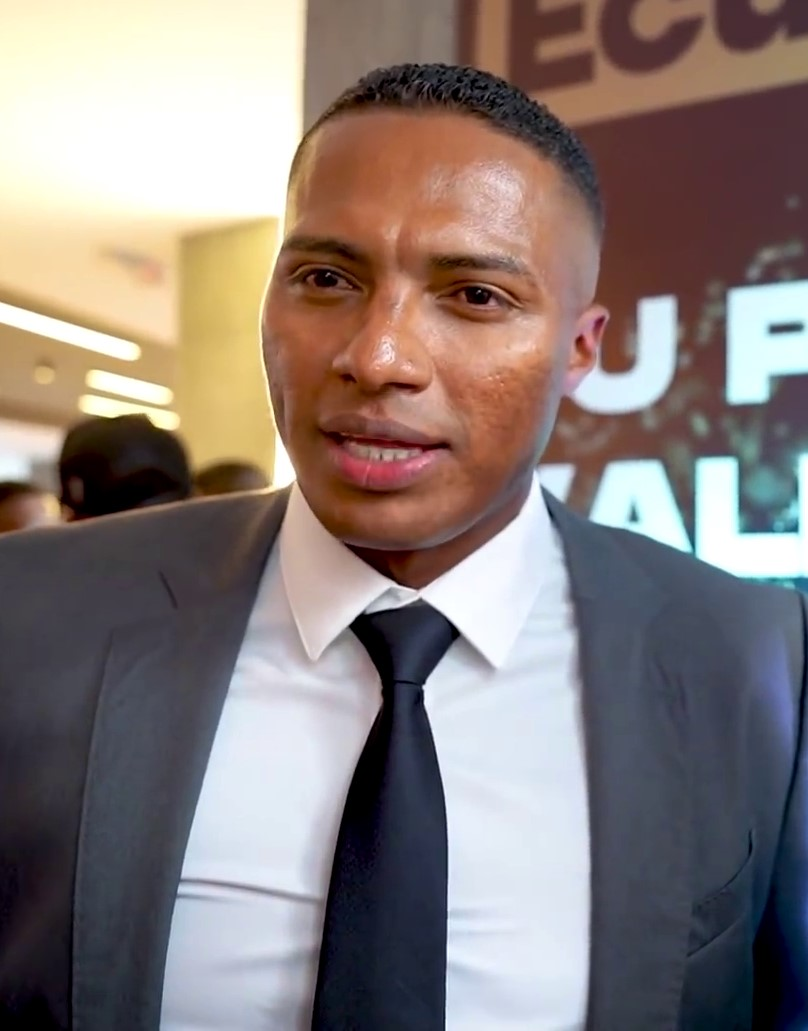
- Valencia in 2022

Personal information
- Full name: Luis Antonio Valencia Mosquera
- Date of birth: 4 August 1985 (age 41)
- Place of birth: Lago Agrio, Ecuador
- Height: 5 ft 11 in (1.80 m)
- Positions: Right winger; right-back

Youth career
- 1999–2001: Caribe Junior
- 2001–2003: El Nacional

Senior career*
Years	Team	Apps	(Gls)
2003–2005	El Nacional	88	(12)
2005–2008	Villarreal	2	(0)
2005–2006	→ Recreativo (loan)	12	(0)
2006–2008	→ Wigan Athletic (loan)	37	(1)
2008–2009	Wigan Athletic	47	(6)
2009–2019	Manchester United	241	(17)
2019–2020	LDU Quito	20	(1)
2020–2021	Querétaro	15	(1)
Total		467	(38)

International career
2004–2019	Ecuador	99	(11)
- * Club domestic league appearances and goals

Luis Antonio Valencia Mosquera (Spanish pronunciation: [anˈtonjo βaˈlensja]; (Note: In isolation, Valencia is pronounced [baˈlensja].) born 4 August 1985) is an Ecuadorian former professional footballer who played primarily as a right-sided player throughout his career, initially as a right winger, before developing into a right-back. He is regarded as one of the best Ecuadorian footballers of all time.

After progressing through the youth system at El Nacional, Valencia became a first team regular and made over 80 appearances for the club. He won the Ecuadorian Serie A with them before signing for La Liga side Villarreal in 2005. He only made two league appearances for the Spanish side in between loan spells at Recreativo for the 2005–06 season and later English Premier League club Wigan Athletic from 2006 to 2008. Wigan Athletic later signed Valencia on a three-year deal for an undisclosed fee in January 2008.

His performances for Wigan Athletic soon attracted attention from several high-profile clubs, and he signed for Manchester United in June 2009. His time there established him as one of the greatest Ecuadorian players of all time, as Valencia was voted into the PFA Team of the Year in his debut season, and went on to win two Premier League titles, an FA Cup, two League Cups, three FA Community Shields and the UEFA Europa League, captaining the club in his final season. After ten years with United, Valencia returned to Ecuador in July 2019, signing with LDU Quito, with whom he won the inaugural Copa Ecuador in his first season. He announced his retirement in May 2021.

Valencia made his Ecuador debut in 2004 and has represented his country at the 2006 FIFA World Cup, the 2007 Copa América, the 2011 Copa América, the 2014 FIFA World Cup, the Copa América Centenario and the 2019 Copa América. Valencia won 99 caps and scored 11 goals for his country.

== Early life ==
Valencia was born on 4 August 1985 in Lago Agrio, near the city of Nueva Loja, Ecuador, which is located in the Amazon rainforest. Valencia helped his mother sell drinks outside the stadium of his local club at Lago Agrio and would then search for empty bottles for his father to sell to a bottle-deposit in the capital, Quito. Valencia used to play barefoot on the pitch next to the bungalow he shared with his parents, five brothers and sister.

When Valencia was aged 11, scout Pedro Perlaza spotted him playing on a dusty field near his home, and signed him to the local FA-run sports academy in Sucumbíos. At the age of 16, Valencia did not tell his father he left home to take up an offer to play for El Nacional, the military-backed club in Quito. Nobody knew about Valencia's decision, except his mother and his elder brother, Carlos Alfredo, who paid the fare for his eight-hour bus journey. Valencia began in central midfield and on a salary of 50 dollars a month.

== Club career ==
=== El Nacional ===
Valencia started his career at El Nacional and within a year he was fast-tracked into the under-20s, where he played alongside striker Christian "Chucho"’ Benítez. Valencia made his debut for El Nacional alongside his idol Édison Méndez. Valencia won his first club title as part of the El Nacional team that won the 2005 Clausura Tournament, earning him the attention of both the national team's manager and Spanish clubs.

=== Villarreal and Recreativo ===
Valencia moved to Spanish club Villarreal in 2005. After failing to break into the first-team, however, he was loaned to Recreativo to gain experience. Valencia helped Recreativo gain promotion to La Liga as they finished the season top of the table.

=== Wigan Athletic ===
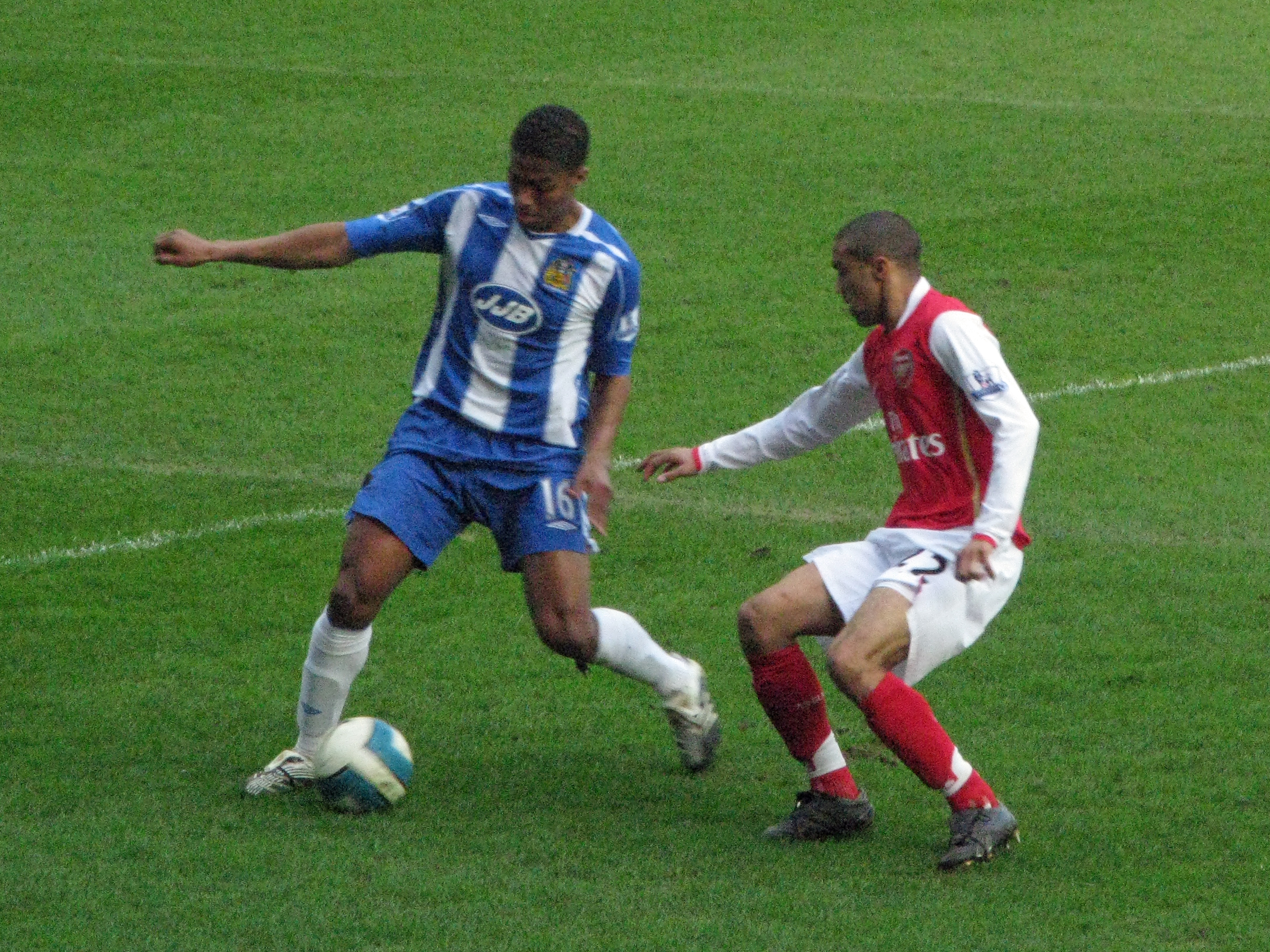
Valencia taking on Arsenal's Gaël Clichy for Wigan Athletic in 2008

On 3 August 2006, Valencia joined English Premier League club Wigan Athletic, initially on a year-long loan deal. He made his debut for Wigan on 19 August 2006, in a 2–1 loss away to Newcastle United. His first goal for Wigan came in a 4–0 home win over Manchester City on 21 October 2006. Valencia returned after a three-month absence as he played 78 minutes of a 2–0 home loss to Everton on 21 January 2007. Valencia was sent off for the first time for Wigan on 9 April 2007, receiving a straight red card for a two-footed challenge on Wilfred Bouma during a 1–1 away draw against Aston Villa.

The loan was extended into the following season, and on 18 January 2008, he transferred for an undisclosed fee, signing a three-and-a-half-year contract. The deal was said to be worth around £5 million. Valencia scored his first goal of the 2007–08 season in a 2–0 win over Derby County on 23 February 2008, before netting his first Wigan brace in a 2–0 away victory over Aston Villa on 3 May 2008.

Valencia's first goal of the following season came in Wigan's 5–0 away victory over Hull City on 30 August 2008. He then grabbed a goal in the 2–1 home win over Manchester City on 28 September 2008, but followed it up by receiving a red card in the 3–2 loss at Liverpool on 18 October 2008. Valencia scored his final goal for Wigan on 13 December 2008, as he inspired them to a 3–0 victory over Blackburn Rovers. Wigan boss Steve Bruce confirmed that Valencia turned down the chance to join Real Madrid in January 2009. On 9 February 2009, Valencia was ruled out of action for three weeks after suffering a recurrence of a hamstring injury. In early June 2009, Wigan chairman Dave Whelan announced that he would not force Valencia to stay at the club.

=== Manchester United ===
==== 2009–2012: Premier League success and Player of the Year awards ====
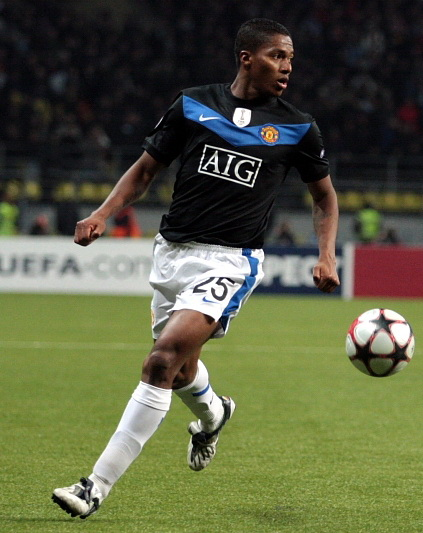
Valencia playing against CSKA Moscow during his first season at Manchester United

On 30 June 2009, Valencia became Manchester United's first summer signing, having cut his holiday short to have a medical with the club. He signed a four-year contract for an undisclosed fee, rumoured to be in the region of £16 million.

On 29 July 2009, he made his debut for United and scored his first goal in the process, netting United's second in a 2–1 pre-season victory over Boca Juniors in the Audi Cup. He made his competitive debut for Manchester United in the 2009 FA Community Shield, when he came on for the injured Nani in the 62nd minute. On 17 October 2009, he scored his first competitive goal for the club, scoring United's second in a 2–1 league victory against Bolton Wanderers. His first UEFA Champions League goal followed four days later in a 1–0 away victory against CSKA Moscow.

Valencia provided the assist for Wayne Rooney's winning goal in the 2010 League Cup Final against Aston Villa on 28 February 2010 and was named player of the match as United won 2–1. On 25 April 2010, Valencia was included in the PFA Premier League Team of the Year in his debut season for the club alongside teammates Patrice Evra, Darren Fletcher, and Wayne Rooney.

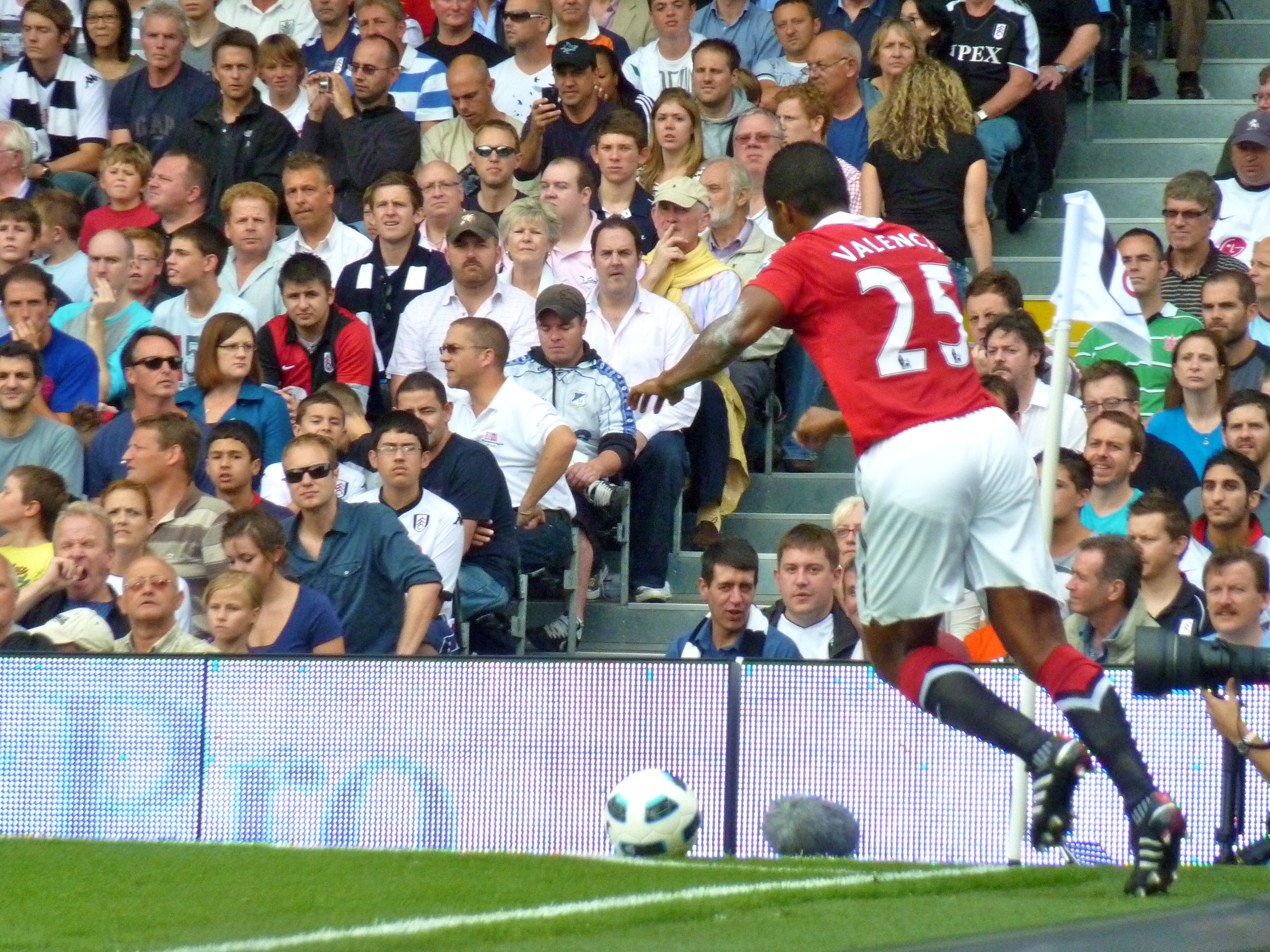
Valencia taking a corner kick in the 2–2 draw away to Fulham on 22 August 2010

On 8 August 2010, Valencia scored United's first goal in their 3–1 win over Chelsea in the 2010 Community Shield. During a Champions League game against Rangers on 14 September 2010, Valencia suffered a break to his left ankle. An operation the morning after the match showed that his left ankle was fractured and dislocated, and that his ankle ligaments were damaged. On 28 February 2011, Valencia returned to training with Manchester United's first team.

He played his first game back from injury against Arsenal in the FA Cup sixth round on 12 March 2011. On 9 April 2011, he scored his first league goal of the season as he netted the second of a 2–0 home win over Fulham. Days later, he scored the first goal in United's 4–1 victory against the German team Schalke 04 in the second leg of the semi-final of the 2010–11 UEFA Champions League, game in which he was selected as player of the match. He became the first Ecuadorian player to win a Premier League medal, in the 2010–11 season. Valencia was a starter in United's 3–1 defeat to Barcelona in the 2011 Champions League Final at Wembley Stadium.

On 1 August 2011, Valencia agreed a new four-year deal with Manchester United, keeping him at the club until the summer of 2015. Prior to the start of the 2011–12 season, Valencia picked up an ankle injury on international duty with Ecuador at the Copa América during the summer. He missed United's entire pre-season tour of the United States because of the injury. He also missed the first month of the season because of a lack of match fitness. Valencia made his first start of the season away at Benfica in the first group stage match of the UEFA Champions League. On 18 September 2011, he returned to Premier League action, replacing the injured Chris Smalling at right-back in the 3–1 win against Chelsea. He then continued to play right-back in the next three games against Leeds United in the League Cup, away at Stoke City, and home against Norwich City in the Premier League. Valencia scored his first goal of the season, in a fourth round League Cup tie against Aldershot Town, receiving the ball in the middle of the park and then turning and firing in from 25-yards to seal a 3–0 victory.

Valencia scored his second goal of the season, the opening goal in Manchester United's Champions League fixture against Oțelul Galați. The game finished 2–0. On 26 December 2011, Valencia scored the fourth goal for Manchester United in a 5–0 home win against Wigan Athletic. He received the ball on the right hand edge of the penalty area and rifled a shot across goal and into the far corner. On 22 January 2012, Valencia scored the first goal against Arsenal with a header, before later setting up Danny Welbeck to win the game 2–1. On 2 April 2012, in his 100th appearance for the club in all competitions, Valencia scored the first goal in a 2–0 win against Blackburn Rovers, powerfully curling the ball around Paul Robinson and inside the far corner. Five minutes later, Valencia set up the second goal for Ashley Young.

Valencia received the Sir Matt Busby Player of the Year and the Manchester United Players' Player of the Year awards for his contributions in the 2011–12 season. He also won the Manchester United Goal of the Season award for his goal against Blackburn Rovers on 2 April 2012.

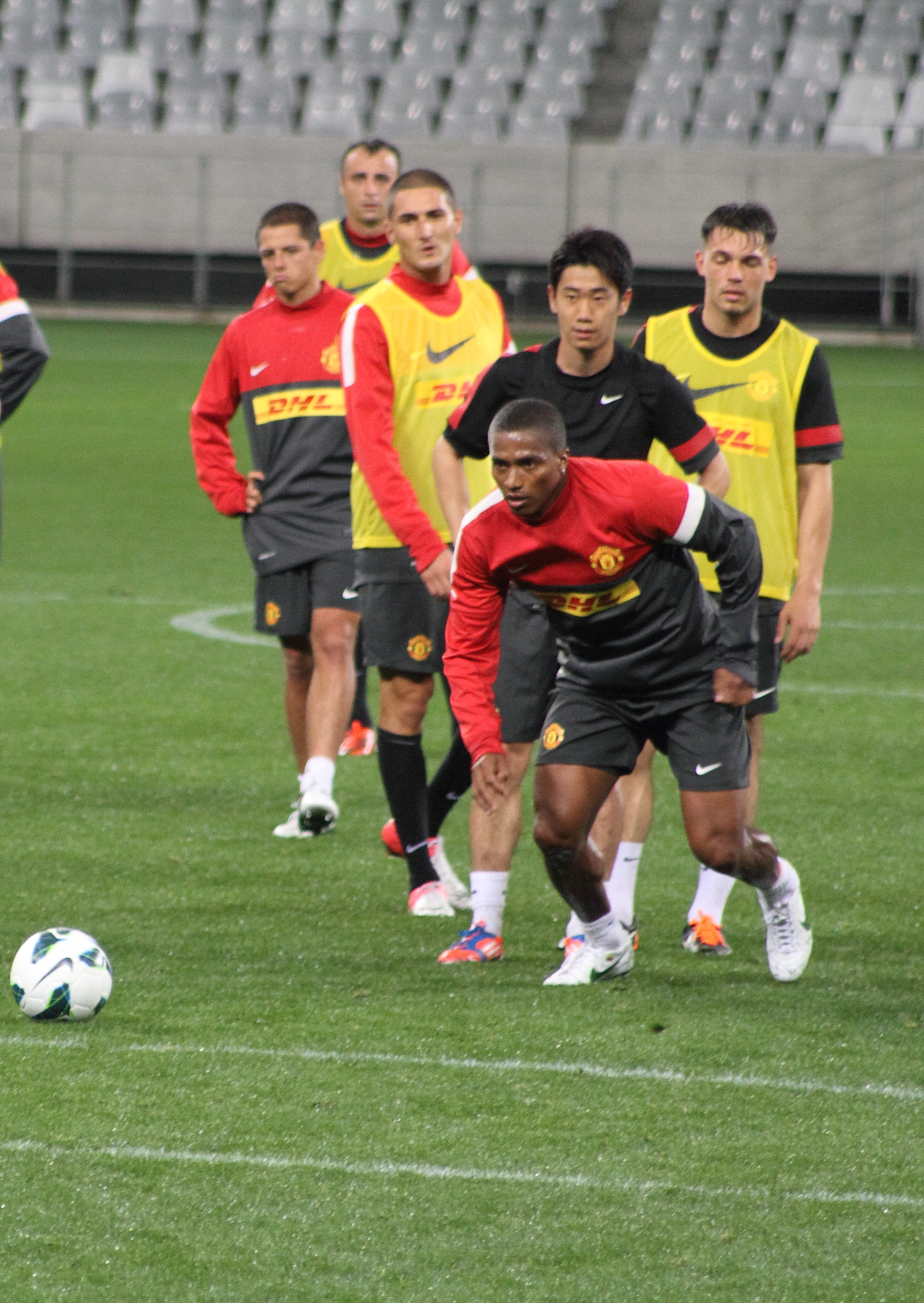
Valencia in training on a pre-season tour of South Africa in July 2012

On 3 July 2012, it was confirmed that Valencia would wear the number 7 shirt, worn by past players such as Johnny Berry, Steve Coppell, Bryan Robson, Eric Cantona, David Beckham and Cristiano Ronaldo, after Sir Alex Ferguson offered the number upon Michael Owen's departure from the club. The number 25 shirt was given to Valencia's new teammate Nick Powell.

==== 2013–2016: Permanent switch to right-back ====
On 17 April 2013, Valencia scored his first league goal of the season, against West Ham United. On 22 April 2013, Valencia won his second Premier League title after Manchester United defeated Aston Villa in a 3–0 home win.

After an indifferent 2012–13 season wearing the number 7 shirt, Valencia returned to his former number 25 shirt. Valencia started the season with a goal against Sevilla in Rio Ferdinand's testimonial at Old Trafford in a 3–1 defeat on 9 August 2013. Valencia subsequently appeared in the Community Shield against Wigan coming on as a substitute for Wilfried Zaha in the 62nd minute. Valencia started the Champions League campaign with a goal against Bayer Leverkusen the fourth in a 4–2 home victory as well as giving Robin van Persie an assist for the first on that night on 18 September 2013. He got his first goal of the Premier League season against Fulham on 2 November 2013, the first in a 3–1 away win. Valencia scored the first goal in the 5–0 away victory to Manchester United against Bayer Leverkusen in the group stage of Champions League on 27 November 2013. On 11 January 2014, Valencia scored in the 47th minute against Swansea City in a 2–0 home win. On 21 June 2014, he signed a three-year contract extension, which included an option to extend the deal until June 2018.

The arrival of new manager Louis van Gaal led to Valencia being deployed in both the right-back and right-wing back positions, where he had occasionally played under both Sir Alex Ferguson and David Moyes. He made his first start of the season in this position, assisting Juan Mata in a 1–1 draw against Sunderland on 24 August 2014.

On 25 October 2015, Valencia suffered a foot injury in a 0–0 draw with Manchester City, which required surgery and ruled him out for at least four months. He made his return on 17 March 2016 in the Europa League Round of 16 second leg against Liverpool, ending in a 1–1 draw. Valencia played the full 120 minutes at right-back in the 2016 FA Cup Final against Crystal Palace on 21 May 2016, in which United won 2–1 after extra-time.

==== 2017–2019: Final years with United ====
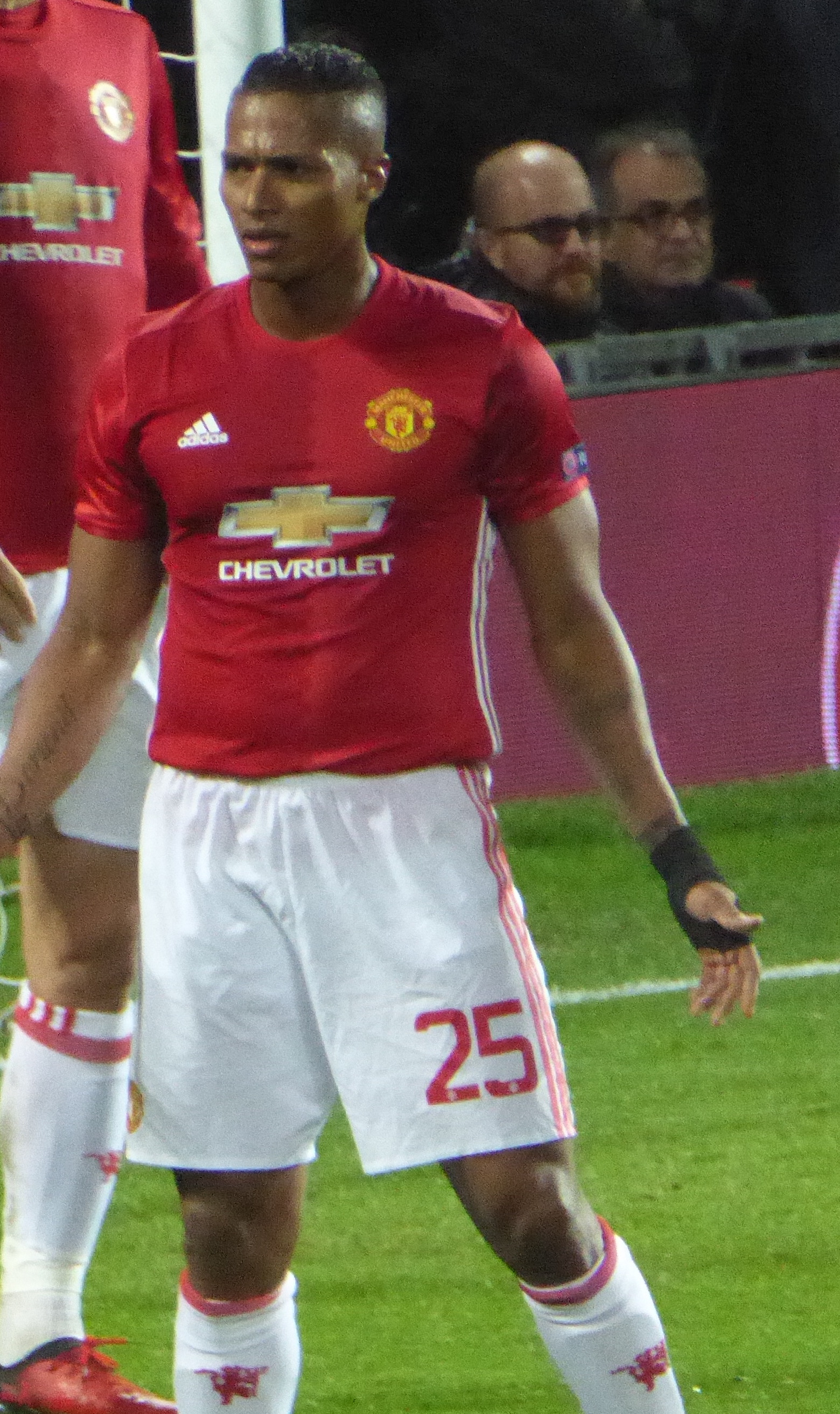
Valencia (right) during a Europa League game against FC Rostov in 2017

Manchester United triggered a one-year extension in Valencia's contract on 17 January 2017, keeping him at the club until 2018. On 19 March 2017, Valencia made his 200th league appearance for United and scored in injury time, after goalkeeper Víctor Valdés slipped, to complete a 3–1 victory over Middlesbrough. On 26 May 2017, two days after captaining United in the 2017 UEFA Europa League Final, his contract at the club was extended until June 2019, with an option to extend for a further year. On 17 September 2017, Valencia scored his first goal of the season in a 4–0 win against Everton with a 20-yard half-volley. Later on 14 October, Valencia captained the team in his 300th appearance as Manchester United drew 0–0 at Liverpool. After being ruled out for four weeks with a hamstring injury, Valencia returned to action as he scored the opening goal in a 3–0 home victory against Stoke City in January 2018.

At the beginning of the 2018–19 season, and after the retirement of Michael Carrick, Manchester United manager José Mourinho announced Valencia would be the club's first captain. In March 2019, Manchester United declined to take up the option to extend Valencia's contract by an extra year, bringing to an end his 10-year spell with the club when his contract expired in June. Valencia left Manchester United having registered 325 Premier League appearances, which remains a record for a South American player.

=== LDU Quito ===
After being released by Manchester United, LDU Quito signed Valencia on a free transfer. He made his debut for the club in a 1–0 victory over América de Quito in the Ecuadorian Serie A on 18 July 2019.

=== Querétaro ===
On 27 November 2020, Valencia signed with Mexican club Querétaro on a free transfer.

On 12 May 2021, Valencia announced his retirement from professional football.

== International career ==
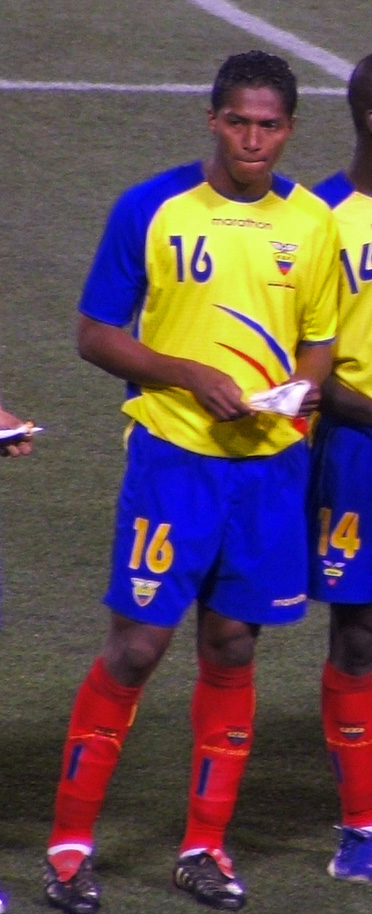
Valencia lining up for Ecuador in 2007

He made his senior international debut for Ecuador in 2004.

On 27 March 2005, he scored his first two international goals, coming in a 5–2 World Cup qualifying win against Paraguay. Three days later he scored again in a qualifying match, this time netting in 2–2 draw away to Peru. Valencia played in all of Ecuador's 2006 FIFA World Cup matches, and was chosen as a nominee for FIFA's ideal 11 team, which recognises the top stars for every position in the World Cup. He was also shortlisted as one of the six potential candidates for the Gillette Best Young Player award. An email broadly circulated in England encouraged votes for Valencia, in an attempt to prevent Cristiano Ronaldo from winning. Valencia ended up receiving the greatest number of votes in the online poll, but since the award's winner is determined by a combination of the fan vote and a judging panel, the award was eventually given to Lukas Podolski.

On 27 June 2007, Valencia netted Ecuador's first goal of their 2007 Copa América campaign, however they eventually lost the match 3–2 to Chile and finished the tournament bottom of their group. Valencia received hs first red card for Ecuador on 12 October 2008, during a 1–0 victory over Chile in a World Cup qualifier. On 9 September 2009, Valencia scored his first 2010 World Cup qualification goal, netting in a 3–1 away victory over Bolivia. On 10 October 2009, he netted for the second qualifier in a row, this time netting Ecuador's single goal in a 2–1 defeat to the hands of Uruguay.

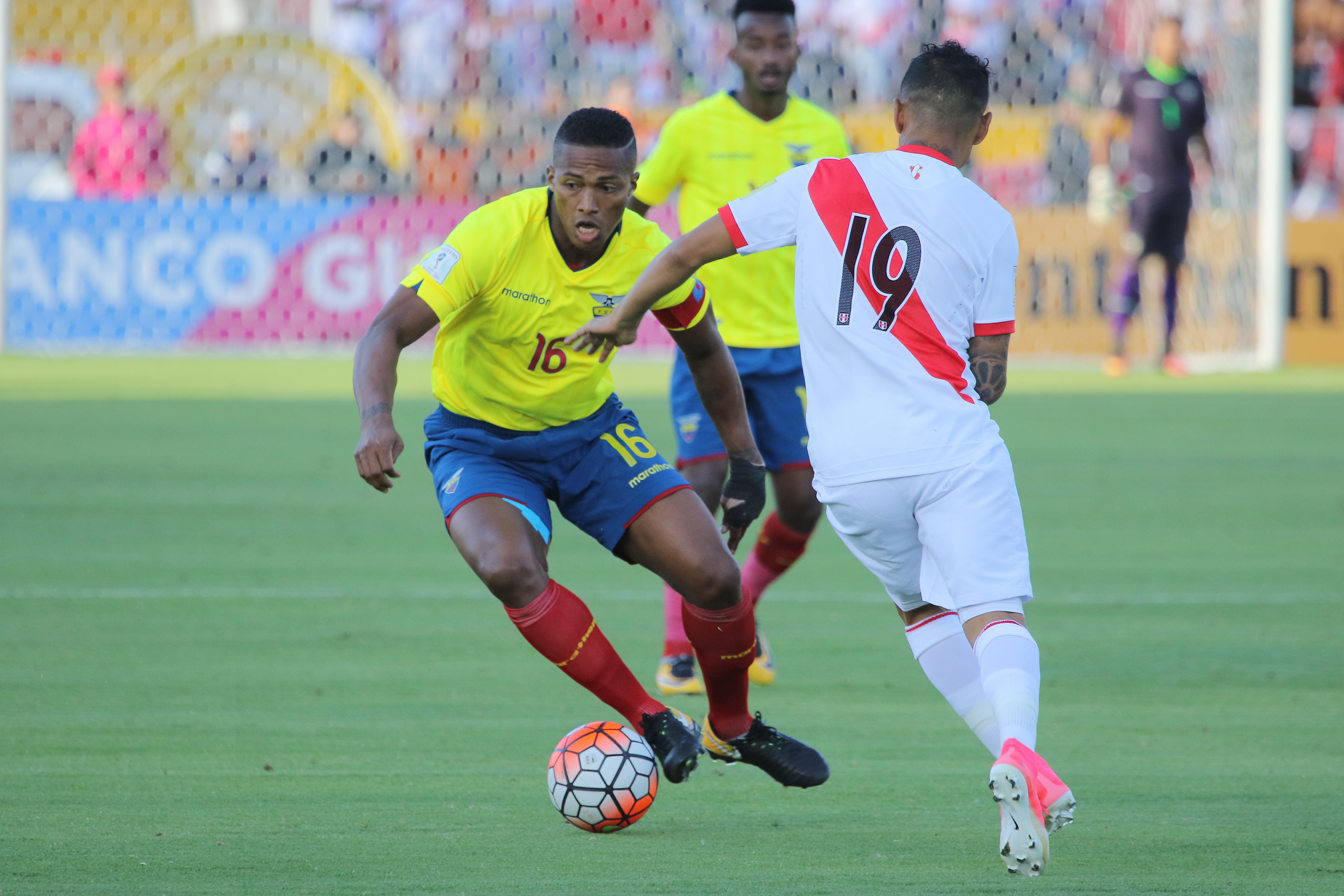
Valencia (left) in action against Peru

On 3 July 2011, in a match against Paraguay at the 2011 Copa América, he suffered a sprained left ankle and was forced off at half-time.

In June 2014, Valencia was named in Ecuador's squad for the 2014 FIFA World Cup. In a preparation match, he captained the team to a 2–2 draw with England at the Sun Life Stadium in Miami. During the match, he was fouled by Raheem Sterling and responded by shoving Sterling and grabbing him by the throat. Referee Jair Marrufo decided to send off both Valencia and Sterling. Valencia later apologized for his reaction. Valencia captained La Tri during all three of their matches at the World Cup and was sent off for a foul on Lucas Digne during their final game against France, a goalless draw at the Maracanã which saw his team eliminated.

Valencia missed the 2015 Copa América in Chile due to urgent ankle surgery. He was selected in the Ecuador squad for the 2016 Copa América Centenario and on 12 June 2016, he scored in Ecuador's 4–0 victory over Haiti at MetLife Stadium.

== Personal life ==
Valencia and his wife, Zoila, have a daughter named Domenica, who was born during the 2006 World Cup. Along with former Wigan Athletic teammates Maynor Figueroa and Wilson Palacios, Valencia began taking English lessons. Whilst at Wigan his English lessons would be once a week, however since his move to Manchester United they were sometimes every day. Former Manchester United manager Sir Alex Ferguson described Valencia as a quiet and shy boy. His older brother, Éder, was also a professional footballer who played for Independiente José Terán in Ecuador.

Valencia also has a tattoo on his upper arm paying tribute to former international teammate and close friend Christian "Chucho" Benítez, who died in 2013.

== Career statistics ==
=== Club ===
Appearances and goals by club, season and competition
Club	Season	League			National cup (Note: Includes Copa Ecuador, FA Cup)		League cup (Note: Includes Football League/EFL Cup)		Continental		Other		Total	
Club	Season	Division	Apps	Goals	Apps	Goals	Apps	Goals	Apps	Goals	Apps	Goals	Apps	Goals
El Nacional	2003	Ecuadorian Serie A	29	3	–		–		–		–		29	3
El Nacional	2004	Ecuadorian Serie A	41	5	–		–		4 (Note: Appearances in Copa Libertadores)	0	–		45	5
El Nacional	2005	Ecuadorian Serie A	14	4	–		–		–		–		14	4
El Nacional	Total		84	12	–		–		4	0	–		88	12
Villarreal	2005–06	La Liga	2	0	0	0	–		0	0	–		2	0
Recreativo (loan)	2005–06	Segunda División	12	0	0	0	–		–		–		12	0
Wigan Athletic (loan)	2006–07	Premier League	22	1	0	0	0	0	–		–		22	1
Wigan Athletic (loan)	2007–08	Premier League	15	0	0	0	0	0	–		–		15	0
Wigan Athletic (loan)	Total		37	1	0	0	0	0	–		–		37	1
Wigan Athletic	2007–08	Premier League	16	3	1	0	0	0	–		–		17	3
Wigan Athletic	2008–09	Premier League	31	3	1	0	3	0	–		–		35	3
Wigan Athletic	Total		47	6	2	0	3	0	–		–		52	6
Manchester United	2009–10	Premier League	34	5	1	0	4	0	9 (Note: Appearances in UEFA Champions League)	2	1 (Note: Appearance in FA Community Shield)	0	49	7
Manchester United	2010–11	Premier League	10	1	2	0	0	0	7	1	1	1	20	3
Manchester United	2011–12	Premier League	27	4	2	0	3	1	6 (Note: Five appearances and one goal in UEFA Champions League, one appearance in UEFA Europa League)	1	0	0	38	6
Manchester United	2012–13	Premier League	30	1	6	0	0	0	4	0	–		40	1
Manchester United	2013–14	Premier League	29	2	1	0	3	0	10	2	1	0	44	4
Manchester United	2014–15	Premier League	32	0	3	0	0	0	–		–		35	0
Manchester United	2015–16	Premier League	14	0	3	0	1	0	4 (Note: Three appearances in UEFA Champions League, one appearance in UEFA Europa League)	0	–		22	0
Manchester United	2016–17	Premier League	28	1	1	0	4	0	9 (Note: Appearances in UEFA Europa League)	0	1	0	43	1
Manchester United	2017–18	Premier League	31	3	3	0	0	0	4	0	1 (Note: Appearance in UEFA Super Cup)	0	39	3
Manchester United	2018–19	Premier League	6	0	0	0	0	0	3	0	–		9	0
Manchester United	Total		241	17	22	0	15	1	56	6	5	1	339	25
LDU Quito	2019	Ecuadorian Serie A	10	0	5	0	–		4	0	6 (Note: Appearances in Ecuadorian Serie A Playoffs)	1	25	1
LDU Quito	2020	Ecuadorian Serie A	4	0	0	0	–		2	0	1 (Note: Appearances in Supercopa Ecuador)	0	7	0
LDU Quito	Total		14	0	5	0	–		6	0	7	1	32	1
Querétaro	2020–21	Liga MX	15	1	–		–		–		–		15	1
Career total			452	37	29	0	18	1	66	6	12	2	577	46

=== International ===
Appearances and goals by national team and year
National team	Year	Apps	Goals
Ecuador	2004	2	0
Ecuador	2005	12	3
Ecuador	2006	8	0
Ecuador	2007	7	1
Ecuador	2008	6	0
Ecuador	2009	6	2
Ecuador	2010	2	0
Ecuador	2011	6	0
Ecuador	2012	6	0
Ecuador	2013	12	2
Ecuador	2014	7	0
Ecuador	2015	4	0
Ecuador	2016	9	2
Ecuador	2017	5	0
Ecuador	2018	1	1
Ecuador	2019	6	0
Total		99	11

==== International goals ====
Ecuador score listed first, score column indicates score after each Valencia goal.

International goals by date, venue, opponent, score, result and competition
No.	Date	Venue	Opponent	Score	Result	Competition
1	27 March 2005	Estadio Olímpico Atahualpa, Quito, Ecuador	Paraguay	1–2	5–2	2006 FIFA World Cup qualification
2	27 March 2005	Estadio Olímpico Atahualpa, Quito, Ecuador	Paraguay	4–2	5–2	2006 FIFA World Cup qualification
3	30 March 2005	Estadio Nacional de Lima, Lima, Peru	Peru	2–1	2–2	2006 FIFA World Cup qualification
4	27 June 2007	Polideportivo Cachamay, Ciudad Guayana, Venezuela	Chile	1–0	2–3	2007 Copa América
5	9 September 2009	Estadio Hernando Siles, La Paz, Bolivia	Bolivia	2–0	3–1	2010 FIFA World Cup qualification
6	10 October 2009	Estadio Olímpico Atahualpa, Quito, Ecuador	Uruguay	1–0	1–2	2010 FIFA World Cup qualification
7	6 February 2013	Estádio D. Afonso Henriques, Guimarães, Portugal	Portugal	1–0	3–2	Friendly
8	29 May 2013	FAU Stadium, Boca Raton, United States	Germany	1–4	2–4	Friendly
9	12 June 2016	MetLife Stadium, East Rutherford, United States	Haiti	4–0	4–0	Copa América Centenario
10	6 October 2016	Estadio Olímpico Atahualpa, Quito, Ecuador	Chile	1–0	3–0	2018 FIFA World Cup qualification
11	15 November 2018	Estadio Nacional de Lima, Lima, Peru	Peru	1–0	2–0	Friendly

== Honours ==
El Nacional

- Ecuadorian Serie A: 2005

Manchester United

- Premier League: 2010–11, 2012–13
- FA Cup: 2015–16; runner-up: 2017–18
- Football League/EFL Cup: 2009–10, 2016–17
- FA Community Shield: 2010, 2013, 2016
- UEFA Europa League: 2016–17
- UEFA Champions League runner-up: 2010–11

LDU Quito

- Copa Ecuador: 2019
- Supercopa Ecuador: 2020

Individual

- Alan Hardaker Trophy: 2010
- PFA Team of the Year: 2009–10 Premier League
- Sir Matt Busby Player of the Year: 2011–12
- UEFA Europa League Squad of the Season: 2016–17
- Premier League Goal of the Month: September 2017
- Manchester United Players' Player of the Year: 2011–12, 2016–17
- Manchester United Goal of the Season: 2011–12 (vs. Blackburn Rovers, 2 April 2012)

Records

- Guinness World Record for the most goals scored from a corner in 1 minute: 6 goals (shared with Matteo Darmian)
