= Nani (footballer) =

Portuguese footballer (born 1986)

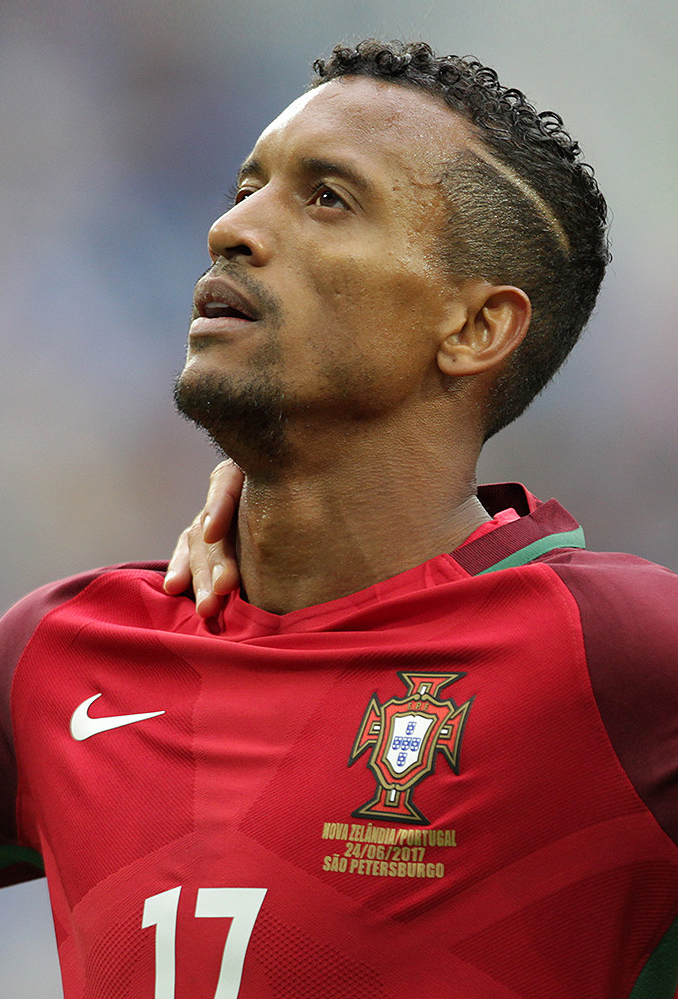
- Nani with Portugal in 2017

Personal information
- Full name: Luís Carlos Almeida da Cunha
- Date of birth: 17 November 1986 (age 40)
- Place of birth: Amadora, Portugal
- Height: 1.77 m (5 ft 10 in)
- Position: Winger

Youth career
- 2000–2003: Real Massamá
- 2003–2005: Sporting CP

Senior career*
Years	Team	Apps	(Gls)
2005–2007	Sporting CP	58	(9)
2007–2015	Manchester United	147	(25)
2014–2015	→ Sporting CP (loan)	27	(7)
2015–2016	Fenerbahçe	28	(8)
2016–2018	Valencia	25	(5)
2017–2018	→ Lazio (loan)	18	(3)
2018–2019	Sporting CP	18	(7)
2019–2021	Orlando City	77	(28)
2022	Venezia	10	(0)
2022–2023	Melbourne Victory	10	(0)
2023–2024	Adana Demirspor	28	(4)
2024	Estrela da Amadora	9	(1)
2026	Aktobe	24	(1)

International career
2006–2007	Portugal U21	11	(1)
2006	Portugal B	1	(0)
2006–2017	Portugal	112	(24)
Medal record
Men's football
Representing Portugal
UEFA European Championship
Winner	2016 France
FIFA Confederations Cup
Third place	2017 Russia
- * Club domestic league appearances and goals as of 31 October 2026

Luís Carlos Almeida da Cunha (pronounced [luˈiʃ ˈkaɾluʃ alˈmɐjdɐ dɐ ˈkuɲɐ] ComM (born 17 November 1986), commonly known as Nani (Portuguese pronunciation: [naˈni]), is a Portuguese professional footballer who plays as a winger. He is known for his pace, flair and work ethic.

Nani began his career with Sporting CP, joining the youth team in 2003 before making his first-team debut in 2005. During his two-year tenure in Portugal he won the Portuguese Cup. Before the 2007–08 season, Nani's performances attracted the attention of English club Manchester United, who secured his services in July 2007. He gained first-team status almost immediately and won four Premier League titles, two League Cups, three FA Community Shields, the FIFA Club World Cup and the UEFA Champions League with them. In the 2010–11 season, he contributed to his club's Premier League title win with 17 assists, the most in the season.

Following a loan back to Sporting, in which he won a second Portuguese Cup, Nani was signed by Turkish side Fenerbahçe in 2015, and a year later he signed for Valencia in Spain. He rejoined Sporting in 2018, winning a third Portuguese Cup as well as the Portuguese League Cup for the first time, before moving to Major League Soccer side Orlando City, whom he captained for three seasons before leaving at the end of 2021. In January 2022, Nani moved to Venezia in Italy. Following brief stints in Australia, Turkey, and another return to Portugal, Nani announced his retirement from football in December 2024. In January 2026, he came out of retirement to sign for Kazakh side Aktobe.

Nani made his Portugal international debut in 2006, scoring his first goal soon after and establishing himself as a key member of the side. He represented his country at three European Championships, in 2008, 2012 and 2016, and in the 2014 FIFA World Cup. Nani started in the final of Euro 2016, and after Cristiano Ronaldo got injured, captained the team to victory. He made 112 appearances and scored 24 goals for his country in total.

== Early life ==
Nani was born on 17 November 1986 in Amadora, Lisbon metropolitan area, Portugal, and is of Cape Verdean descent. He was raised by his aunt Antónia on the Santa Filomena estate in Amadora after being abandoned by his parents. At age five, his father left for a holiday in Cape Verde but never returned, and when he was 12 years old, his mother left Portugal to start a new life in the Netherlands. Nani has nine siblings from his mother, of which he is the youngest, and five from his father. Nani gained his nickname from an elder sister at a young age.

Nani's older brother taught him how to play football and he played with his childhood friend, midfielder Manuel Fernandes. When Nani was around 14, his older brother took him to train with Real Massamá. They were Nani's first club and gave him money, food, and helped him obtain an ID card and a passport. At the age of 16, Nani was training on alternate days with Sporting CP and Benfica. Nani sometimes walked miles to and from practice before Sporting offered him pre-season training. Despite growing up in the Lisbon area, Nani and his brother supported Porto as children. His footballing hero was Luís Figo.

== Club career ==
=== Sporting CP ===
Nani joined Sporting CP from his first club, Real Massamá. After two seasons in the youth team, where he won the National Junior Championship in 2004–05, Nani was promoted to the first team early in the 2005–06 season. On 10 August 2005, he made his Sporting CP debut, coming on as a substitute for Custódio in the 73rd minute in a 1–0 home defeat to Udinese in their third-round qualifier in the UEFA Champions League. Nani made his Portuguese Liga debut on 28 August, replacing Deivid in the 76th minute of a 1–2 victory over Marítimo at the Estádio dos Barreiros. Nani scored his first Sporting goal on 30 October, opening the scoring in a 2–2 draw away to Boavista. Nani ended the first season of his career with 5 goals from 36 appearances across all competitions.

Nani first came into the spotlight after scoring in the UEFA Champions League against Spartak Moscow, scoring Sporting's goal in a 1–1 group stage match on 27 September 2006. Nani helped Sporting win the 2006–07 Taça de Portugal, lifting the trophy after a 1–0 win over Belenenses on 27 May 2007 in the final. He was then named as the SJPF Young Player of the Month for May 2007. Nani's second season with Sporting ended with similar league statistics, with 40 appearances and 6 goals in all competitions.

=== Manchester United ===
==== Early years ====
Nani was sold to Manchester United for €25.5 million, five percent of which was paid to Real Massamá, his first professional club. He passed his medical on 6 June 2007, and signed a five-year contract one month later, joining Portuguese compatriot Cristiano Ronaldo, with whom he lived at the start of his Manchester United career.

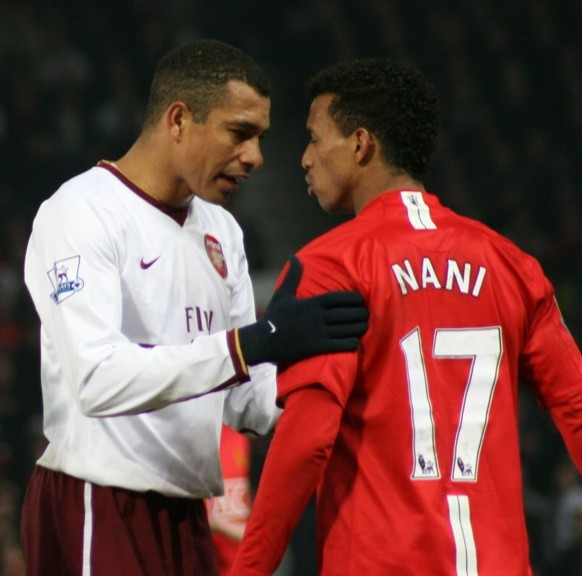
Nani with Gilberto Silva

Nani scored on his debut in a pre-season friendly against Shenzhen, scoring the third in a 6–0 win. He also scored in the following match against Guangzhou Pharmaceutical with a chip off the right post from the left side of the penalty area in a 3–0 win. On 5 August 2007, Nani made his competitive debut for United, coming on as a substitute in the Community Shield against Chelsea. He marked his debut with a trophy after they won 3–0 on penalties, following a 1–1 draw during normal time. This was followed up by Nani's third goal for the club three days later, when he scored against Glentoran in another 3–0 pre-season win.

Nani's Premier League debut came in United's opening match at home to Reading on 12 August as a substitute for Wayne Rooney, who had suffered a foot injury. Two weeks later, on 26 August, Nani scored his first competitive goal for United, netting a 30-yard goal in the 69th minute against Tottenham Hotspur. Nani also set up crucial goals for Louis Saha and Nemanja Vidić, allowing United to defeat both Sunderland and Everton 1–0, respectively. He returned to face his previous club, Sporting CP, in a Champions League tie in September, though it was teammate and fellow former Sporting player Cristiano Ronaldo who scored the winner in a 0–1 victory. Nani opened the scoring in a 4–1 home victory over Middlesbrough on 27 October.

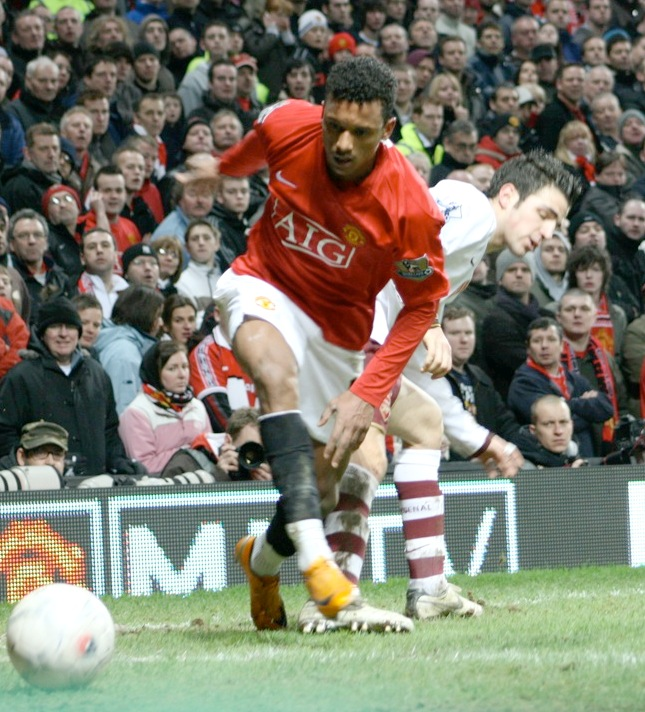
Nani playing for United in 2008

On 16 February 2008, Nani put in a man of the match performance against Arsenal in the FA Cup Fourth Round, his goal and two assists helping United to a 4–0 win over their rivals. During the match, Nani was involved in an altercation with Arsenal captain William Gallas. After the match, Arsenal manager Arsène Wenger was equally displeased, while Gilberto Silva said Nani had a "big head".

On 23 March, Nani set up the second and scored the final goal in a 3–0 victory over rivals Liverpool, in the 79th and 81st minutes respectively, after coming onto the pitch as a substitute. On 3 May, towards the end of a 4–1 home win over West Ham United, Nani was sent off for the first time in his United career for a headbutt on West Ham defender Lucas Neill. On 21 May, Nani came on as a substitute for Wayne Rooney in the 2008 UEFA Champions League Final as United defeated Chelsea 6–5 on penalties following a 1–1 draw after extra time. Nani took and scored Manchester United's crucial fifth penalty in the shootout.

Nani scored his first goal of the 2008–09 season on 23 September 2008, scoring United's third goal in a 3–1 win over Middlesbrough in the last minute to secure passage to the Fourth Round of the League Cup. On 18 October, he scored from a Wayne Rooney assist to complete the 4–0 rout of West Bromwich Albion at Old Trafford. On 20 January 2009, he opened the scoring for United in their 4–2 win at home to Derby County in the second leg of their League Cup semi-final.

==== Breakthrough ====
After Cristiano Ronaldo's transfer to Real Madrid in the 2009 close season, the weight of expectation was on Nani to step up from bit part player and replace his compatriot. Nani's first contribution to United's new season was opening the scoring in the tenth minute of the 2009 FA Community Shield, but United eventually lost the match on penalties after a 2–2 draw. Nani suffered a dislocated shoulder during the match, which was originally expected to keep him out of the start of the season. He recovered in time to play 17 minutes for Portugal against Liechtenstein on 12 August, however, and started the match against Birmingham City on 16 August. Although he provided the assist for Wayne Rooney's winning goal in the 34th minute, Nani was replaced by Ryan Giggs at half-time. On 22 August, Nani scored his first league goal of the 2009–10 season, a free-kick against Wigan Athletic in a 0–5 away win.

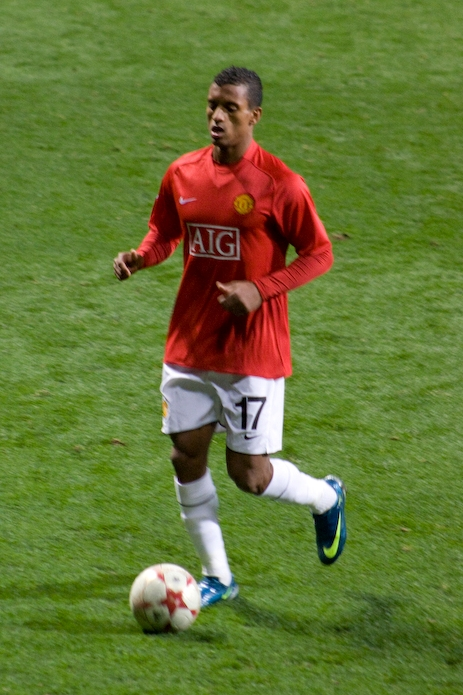
Nani playing for Manchester United in 2008

Following several poor performances, Nani criticised Sir Alex Ferguson for his lack of confidence in him. Despite this outburst, Nani was given a chance to shine and provided an assist for Rooney in the 4–0 league win over Hull City. Soon after this positive display, he put in another good performance in their League Cup semi-final victory over derby rivals Manchester City, revealing a heart-to-heart with Ferguson had resulted in a better display of form. On 31 January 2010, Nani scored the first goal and set up Rooney's 100th career Premier League strike in a 1–3 league victory over Arsenal at the Emirates Stadium. Nani's goal was first thought of as a Manuel Almunia own goal by many sources, but was confirmed as belonging to Nani on 26 March by the Dubious Goals Panel. Following this performance, Nani then set up the second of a 5–0 home win over Portsmouth.

"Maturity is why we're seeing the best of him now, his last three games have been absolutely first class but today was his best."

— Sir Alex Ferguson praises Nani after his performance in the 3–1 victory over Arsenal on 31 January 2010.

However, just four days later, he was sent off for a lunge at Stiliyan Petrov against Aston Villa, which resulted in a three-match ban and ruled him out of the League Cup final. On 10 March, Nani set up Rooney's second in a 4–0 win over Milan, before providing another assist for Rooney four days later, in the 3–0 league victory over Fulham.

On 26 March, Nani signed a new four-year contract with United, committing himself until 2014. A day later, Nani took his assist tally in the league for the season to nine as he set up two goals in a 0–4 win over Bolton Wanderers at the Reebok Stadium, providing goals for Dimitar Berbatov and Darron Gibson. On 7 April, Nani scored his first ever European goals for United, netting two strikes in a 3–2 victory over Bayern Munich. Despite United winning the match, they were eliminated from the competition due to the away goals rule when the aggregate score was 4–4. On 24 April, Nani scored his first league goal at Old Trafford in 18 months, netting United's second in a 3–1 home victory over Tottenham Hotspur. On 2 May, Nani scored for the second match in a row, netting the only goal in a 0–1 away victory over Sunderland. Nani's third season with Manchester United ended with 34 appearances and seven goals in all competitions.

==== 2010–11 season ====
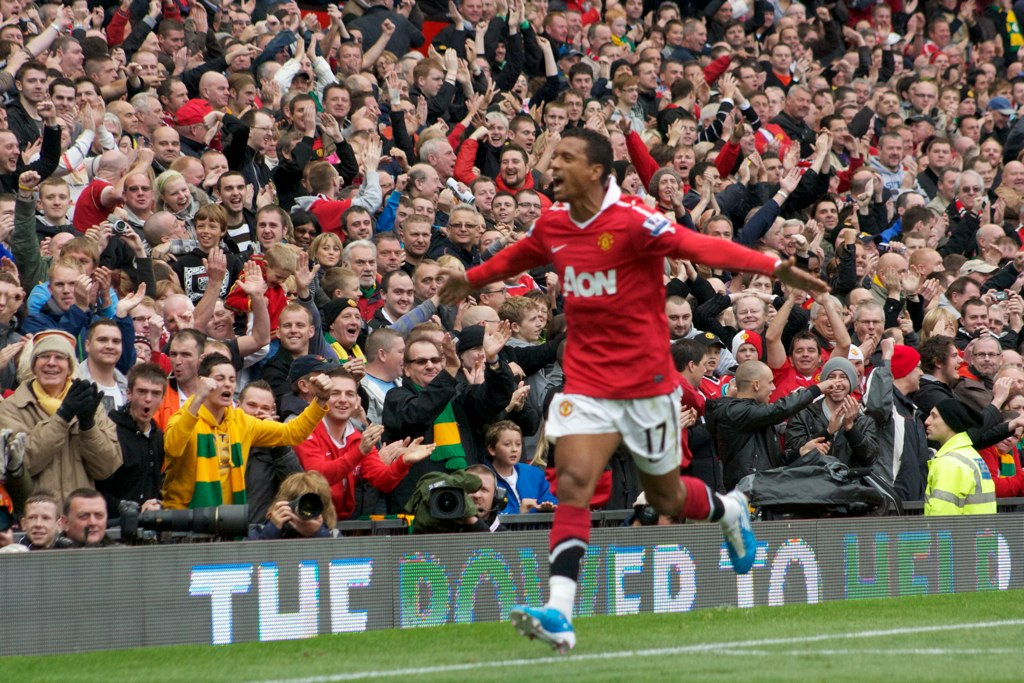
Nani celebrates scoring against West Bromwich Albion in a 2–2 draw on 16 October 2010.

On 22 August 2010, Nani missed a penalty in the 87th minute away to Fulham, and they then equalised two minutes later through Brede Hangeland to end the match 2–2. Six days later, in a 3–0 home victory over West Ham United, Nani scored his first goal of the season and assisted Dimitar Berbatov in a Man of the Match display. Nani scored and assisted Michael Owen in a 2–2 away draw away to Bolton Wanderers on 26 September. On 16 October, Nani scored United's second in a 2–2 home draw against West Bromwich Albion. Four days later, Nani scored his first Champions League goal of the season, scoring the solitary strike in a 1–0 home victory over Bursaspor.

On 30 October, Nani scored a controversial second goal as United beat Tottenham Hotspur 2–0 at home. He scored into an empty net after Tottenham goalkeeper Heurelho Gomes rolled the ball out to take a free-kick he thought had been given for handball; however, play was allowed to go on as referee Mark Clattenburg did not blow his whistle. On 27 November, Nani scored United's fifth goal in a 7–1 home win over Blackburn Rovers. Nani netted his first goal of 2011 as he scored the winning strike in a 2–1 home victory over Stoke City on 4 January.

On 22 January, Nani scored the final goal of a 5–0 home victory over Birmingham City. Nani scored United's only goal in their first league loss of the season, a 2–1 defeat at Wolverhampton Wanderers on 5 February. Seven days later Nani scored his first Manchester derby goal, opening the scoring in a 2–1 home victory over Manchester City.

On 6 March, during United's 3–1 loss against Liverpool at Anfield, Nani was injured following a challenge from Jamie Carragher just before half-time. Nani shed tears after the challenge and was subsequently taken off the pitch in a stretcher. Following post-match comments to the press from Manchester United, it was believed Nani had suffered a broken leg. However, this was not the case as he started training the following week. It was thought Nani would miss up to three weeks as a result of this tackle and would return in April, but he recovered in time to play 61 minutes of a 2–1 victory over Marseille on 15 March.

Nani was revealed as a contender for the Professional Footballers' Association (PFA) Young Player of the Year award alongside teammate Javier Hernández on 8 April. However, many people, including Nani, expressed their surprise he was not nominated for the main award. Following this nomination, he assisted both goals in a 2–0 home win over Fulham on 9 April. Nani lost out to Jack Wilshere for the PFA Young Player of the Year award on 18 April but he was included in the PFA Premier League Team of the Year for the first time. He was awarded for his outstanding season as he was voted Players' Player of the Year at the club's awards night on 18 May.

==== 2011–12 season ====
Nani began the new season by putting in a man of the match performance and scoring twice against derby rivals Manchester City in the 2011 Community Shield, including a 94th-minute winner, as United came from two goals down to win 3–2 on 7 August 2011. He scored his first league goal of the 2011–12 season by netting United's fifth goal in an 8–2 victory over Arsenal on 28 August. Nani made his 100th Premier League appearance on 18 September as he scored in a 3–1 home win over Chelsea. He scored with a long-range strike after cutting inside from the right wing. He was also awarded the man of the match. In United's following league match at the Britannia Stadium, Nani scored his third goal of the season in a 1–1 draw with Stoke City. He played a neat one-two with Darren Fletcher before making his way through Stoke's defence and firing a low shot inside the left post. Nani started the match against Manchester City, where they fell victim to a 1–6 beating at home to their neighbours. On 1 November, Nani was shortlisted for the prestigious FIFA Ballon d'Or.

On 10 December, the first match after United's elimination from the UEFA Champions League, Nani scored a brace in a home match against Wolverhampton Wanderers. He opened the scoring in the 17th minute to put them 1–0 up with a shot into the bottom left corner. He scored his second goal in the 56th minute, tapping in from Antonio Valencia's drilled cross across the six-yard box to extend the lead to 3–1. He was later replaced by winger Ashley Young as the match finished 4–1 to the home side. Nani scored his sixth league goal of the season and provided two assists in a 5–0 away win at Fulham on 21 December. He first advanced on a run down the left flank before crossing for Danny Welbeck to slot home. He then met a Ryan Giggs cross with his head to glance United into a 2–0 lead. He then returned the compliment, squaring for Giggs to put United 3–0 up before half-time.

During Manchester United's 2–1 win against Arsenal on 22 January, Nani sustained a foot injury from a tackle by Arsenal defender Laurent Koscielny in the 75th minute and was replaced by Ashley Young. After a scan on Nani's foot, he was feared to have suffered a metatarsal injury, thus not being able to play for two months. Nani returned to football on 15 April at United's match against Aston Villa as a substitute, replacing Young on the left wing. He scored a goal in stoppage time (93rd minute) with a low shot past Villa goalkeeper Shay Given from Jonny Evans' through-ball assist, resulting in a 4–0 win over Villa. Nani then followed this with another goal when chipping Tim Howard at his near post in a 4–4 draw at Old Trafford against Everton.

==== 2012–13 season ====
During the season Nani scored a single Premier League goal, and three in all competitions, marking a significant decrease compared with previous seasons. He played just 11 times in the league, including only seven as a starter, although United ended up winning the league 11 points ahead of second place, to give Nani his fourth Premier League winner's medal. His most memorable appearance in the season came in the second leg of United's UEFA Champions League round of 16 tie with Real Madrid. With Manchester United leading 1—0, Nani was sent off in the 56th minute for a high boot on Álvaro Arbeloa; Real Madrid took advantage of their numerical superiority and scored twice to win the match 2–1, and the tie 3–2 on aggregate.

==== 2013–14 season ====
On 5 September 2013, Nani renewed his contract with Manchester United, which was to keep him at the club until 2018. He started his first match of 2013–14 season against Liverpool in the League Cup. Despite this, Nani spent most of the season struggling against injury and trying to find form. He scored only once during the season.

==== Loan return to Sporting CP ====
On 19 August 2014, Sporting CP announced the return of Nani to the club on a season-long loan from Manchester United, as part of a deal that brought centre-back Marcos Rojo to United. Nani was given the number 77 shirt.

Nani made his comeback at the Estádio José Alvalade in a Primeira Liga match against Arouca, four days after signing. He missed a penalty, received a yellow card and was substituted in the 77th minute as the match ended in a 1–0 win for Sporting. He scored his first goal of this loan on 17 September, opening a 1–1 draw at Maribor in the first match of the 2014–15 UEFA Champions League group stage. He was also voted Man of the Match. Nani scored his first league goal for the club four days later in a 4–0 win against Gil Vicente On 3 January 2015, Nani was sent off for two bookings in a 3–0 win over Estoril. Nani scored in Sporting's penalty shootout victory over Braga in the 2015 Taça de Portugal final, which earned the club their first trophy since 2008.

=== Fenerbahçe ===
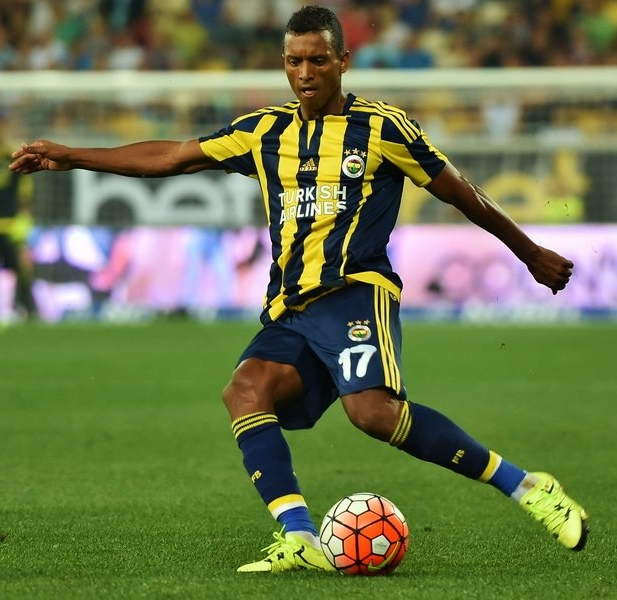
Nani with Fenerbahçe in 2015

On 6 July 2015, Nani joined Turkish club Fenerbahçe, signing a three-year deal for a £4.25 million transfer fee. He and his former United teammate Robin van Persie debuted 22 days later in a goalless home draw against Shakhtar Donetsk in the third qualifying round of the season's Champions League, with Nani starting. He scored two goals including the winner, a free-kick in second-half stoppage time, against Antalyaspor on 30 August.

On 26 May 2016, Nani was sent off in the Turkish Cup final for sarcastically applauding the referee following a 1–0 loss to rivals Galatasaray.

=== Valencia ===
In July 2016, Nani signed for Spanish club Valencia on a three-year contract, with Valencia paying an undisclosed fee – reported at £7.2 million – to complete the transfer.

Nani was suspended for Valencia's season opener against Las Palmas as he had not served his suspension from his last game for Fenerbahçe. He debuted on 27 August in the next game, a 1–0 loss at Eibar. On 25 September, in his 500th game as a professional, he opened his Valencia account with his 100th goal to conclude a 2–1 win at Leganés. In his one season at the Mestalla, he suffered four muscular injuries over the course of the campaign – a contrast to his previous year in Turkey, where he played 64 games for club and country.

==== Loan to Lazio ====
On 31 August 2017, Lazio announced the signing of Nani on a season-long loan deal. He scored his first goal for Lazio on 29 October, the final goal of a 5–1 away victory over Benevento.

=== Return to Sporting CP ===
On 11 July 2018, Sporting CP announced that Nani would be rejoining the club. He scored twice in his second game on 18 August, a 2–1 home win over Vitória Setúbal. In one of his final games on 26 January, the 2019 Taça da Liga Final in Braga, he scored Sporting's last penalty as they defeated Porto following a 1–1 draw.

=== Orlando City ===
On 18 February 2019, Nani moved to Orlando City, signing a three-year contract on a Designated Player deal. He made his club debut on 2 March, coming on as a 70th minute substitute in Orlando's season opener at home against New York City FC; the game ended in a 2–2 draw, with Nani registering an assist on Dom Dwyer's equaliser. He scored his first goals for the team on 6 April 2019, when he netted twice in Orlando's 4–3 home win over Colorado Rapids, including the game–winning penalty in the 89th minute.

On 31 July 2020, he missed a penalty in regulation time against Los Angeles FC in the quarter-finals of the MLS is Back Tournament but later assisted the last-minute equalizer and scored the winning penalty during an extra-time shootout. In the semi-finals against Minnesota United, Nani scored two first-half goals to help his team reach the final with a 3–1 win. However, Orlando City eventually finished runners-up in the tournament, losing to Portland Timbers in the final.

On 6 May 2021, Nani's goal against FC Cincinnati in a 3–0 victory five days earlier saw him awarded Goal of the Week. On 2 August, Nani was named Player of the Week for providing a goal and an assist in a 3–2 victory over Atlanta United two days earlier. On 21 May, the MLS Disciplinary Committee suspended Nani for two games for making physical contact with referee Alex Chilowicz during a match at D.C. United five days earlier on 16 May. On 26 November, Nani announced he was leaving Orlando City following the expiration of his contract.

=== Venezia ===
On 14 January 2022, he signed a contract with Italian Serie A club Venezia until the end of the 2022–23 season. The contract was terminated by mutual consent on 8 July 2022.

=== Melbourne Victory ===
On 12 July 2022, Nani signed a two-year contract with A-League Men club Melbourne Victory.

Three days later, he made his unofficial debut for his new team, coming on as a late substitute in a 4–1 loss to former side Manchester United. On 6 January 2023, during an A-League Men game against Brisbane Roar, he ruptured his anterior cruciate ligament in an accidental clash with opponent Connor Chapman, and was ruled out for the rest of the season.

On 31 May 2023, the club confirmed Nani's departure.

=== Adana Demirspor ===
On 13 July 2023, Süper Lig club Adana Demirspor announced the signing of Nani on a one-year contract, with an option for a further year. He was in the squad for 28 league matches and 5 European Cup qualifiers and scored 4 goals in Adana Demirspor. On 13 May 2024, it was announced that he had left the club.

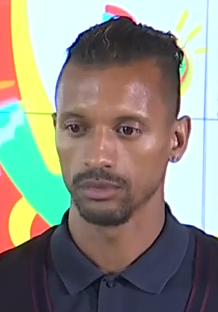
Nani in 2024

=== Estrela Amadora ===
On 8 December 2024, after playing for Estrela Amadora, Nani announced his retirement from professional football.

On 14 September 2025, Nani made a guest appearance in Russia’s Media League Cup, playing for media club Alfa-Banka against Amkal and scoring from the penalty spot in a 3–1 defeat.

=== Aktobe ===
In January 2026, Nani came out of retirement to sign for Kazakhstan Premier League side Aktobe.

Nani made his Kazakhstan Premier League debut on 7 March 2026, coming off the bench in the 71st minute against FC Tobol. It took the Portuguese winger just three minutes to provide an assist for Ivan Ordets, helping his team, Aktobe, cruise to a 4–1 victory.

Nani scored his first brace in Kazakhstan on 30 April 2026, in a 2026 Kazakhstan Cup match between Aktobe and FC Yelimay. His goals helped his team advance to the quarterfinals of the 2026 Kazakhstan Cup. His first goal in the Kazakhstan Football Championship was scored on 21 June 2026, in the 22nd minute of the match against Astana.

On 27 October 2026, he announced he will leave Aktobe after the end of the season. In 26 matches for Aktobe, Nani scored 3 goals and made 5 assists.

== International career ==
=== Portugal under–21 ===
Nani was the youngest member of the Portugal U21 squad at the 2006 UEFA Under-21 Championship, making his debut on 23 May 2006 in a 1–0 defeat to France. He appeared in all three matches, scoring no goals, before Portugal bowed out in group stages. During the 2007 European Under-21 Football Championship, he made four appearances, scoring one goal in a 4–0 victory against Israel U21 in a group stage match on 16 June 2007, and had to be taken off during the match after a right ankle injury.

=== Portugal senior team ===
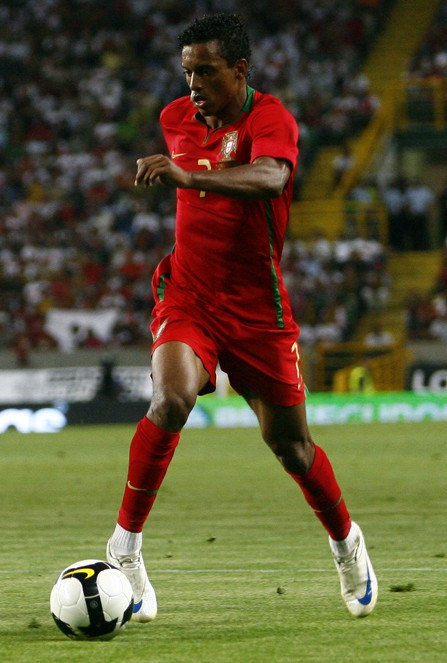
Nani in action for Portugal in 2008

Nani made his first appearance for the senior Portuguese team on 1 September 2006, and marked his debut with a goal in Portugal's 4–2 friendly defeat to Denmark. Nani was omitted from Portugal's 1–1 draw with Armenia, but was recalled for Euro 2008 qualifiers against Poland and Serbia in September. He also provided the assist for Ricardo Quaresma's goal in a friendly against Italy on 6 February 2008. Nani was ruled out of Portugal's friendly with Greece in March 2008 due to injury.

==== UEFA Euro 2008 ====
Nani was a regular member of the Portugal squad in Euro 2008 qualification, and scored one of the goals in the 2–1 away win over Belgium on 2 June 2007. Nani received a call-up to Luiz Felipe Scolari's 23-man squad for Euro 2008 alongside Manchester United teammate Cristiano Ronaldo. During the campaign, Nani played three matches and started just one, but did provide the assist for Hélder Postiga's goal during a substitute appearance in the 3–2 quarter-final defeat to Germany on 19 June.

==== 2010 FIFA World Cup and Qualification ====
Nani's fourth international goal came in Portugal's final friendly match before their World Cup qualifying campaign started, a 5–0 victory over the Faroe Islands on 20 August 2008. Nani scored the final goal of a 4–0 victory over Malta as Portugal started qualification for the 2010 World Cup on 6 September. He opened the scoring in the 3–2 home loss against Denmark four days later. Nani helped Portugal book a play-off place for the World Cup as he netted in the 4–0 home win over Malta on 14 October 2009. Nani was influential in the play-off against Bosnia and Herzegovina, setting up Bruno Alves for the only goal in the first leg. Raul Meireles' goal in the second-leg sealed Portugal's place at the World Cup in South Africa.

On 1 June 2010, Nani netted Portugal's third in a 3–1 victory over Cameroon. Following that game Nani was named in Carlos Queiroz 23-man squad for the tournament, However, on 8 June, Nani was ruled out of the tournament through a shoulder injury and was replaced by Benfica midfielder Ruben Amorim.

==== UEFA Euro 2012 ====
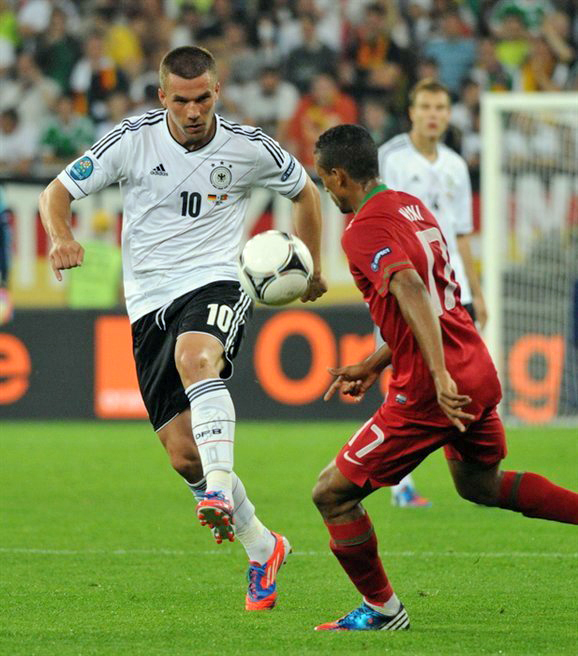
Nani battling for the ball with Lukas Podolski in their Euro 2012 group stage match

Nani scored twice and assisted once in Paulo Bento's first game in charge of Portugal in a 3–1 Euro 2012 qualifying win over Denmark on 8 October 2010. Nani scored twice and set up another again in a 5–3 win over Iceland on 7 October 2011.

==== 2014 FIFA World Cup ====
Nani started in the opening match of the 2014 World Cup for Portugal against Germany. After the match, he stated how the team played well despite the loss and how "the referee has discriminated against us, but that's normal, Portugal against big teams never get help". In the team's second fixture, Nani scored the opening goal for Portugal in a 2–2 draw with the United States.

==== UEFA Euro 2016 ====
Nani scored Portugal's first goal in the last match of the group stage, a 3–3 draw against Hungary on 22 June, to help the team qualify for the knockout round. He then contributed to the only goal of the match in a 1–0 extra-time victory in the round of 16 against Croatia on 25 June. During their quarter-final match on 30 June against Poland, Nani set up Renato Sanches' goal in regulation time and later scored Portugal's fourth penalty in an eventual 5–3 shoot-out victory, following a 1–1 draw after extra-time. In the semi-finals against Wales on 6 July, he scored the second goal in a 2–0 victory. In the final against host-nation France on 10 July, Nani was awarded the captain's armband after Cristiano Ronaldo was forced off in the opening 25 minutes of the match following a challenge from Dimitri Payet. During extra-time, substitute Eder scored in the 109th minute to earn Portugal a 1–0 victory.

==== FIFA 2017 Confederations Cup and 2018 World Cup ====
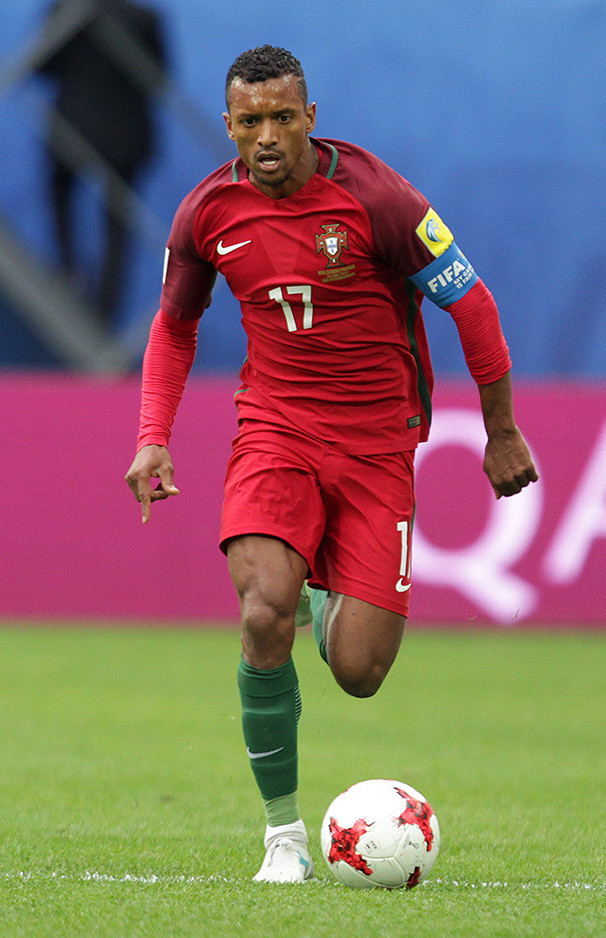
Nani during the 2017 FIFA Confederations Cup

On 24 June 2017, Nani scored the final goal of a 4–0 win over New Zealand in the FIFA Confederations Cup, which saw Portugal finish third.

In May 2018 he was named in Portugal's preliminary 35-man squad for the 2018 World Cup in Russia but did not make the final 23.

== Style of play ==
"Nani's got the potential to do what he wants. He's one of the sharpest players around, has a great strike with both feet – he's got the potential to be a top, top player."

— Manchester United teammate Rio Ferdinand on Nani

In the early stages of his career at Manchester United, Nani's ability and playing style often invited comparisons with club and international teammate Cristiano Ronaldo; however, Nani's style developed into more that of a traditional winger than Ronaldo's evolution into a centre forward.

While being able to play on both wings, Nani was more comfortable on the right side, where he was known to utilise his pace along with intricate dribbling skills and trickery to create space in wide areas and provide crosses for teammates. Though capable of cutting inside from either wing to strike at goal from distance, Nani scored fewer goals but produced a substantially higher proportion of assists than his compatriot Ronaldo. Due to his potent attacking talents, he could play a variety of additional roles as a forward, including as an inverted winger on the left, second striker, or even in a more central position as a main striker, as he played frequently for Portugal.

== Celebration ==
Nani celebrated goals with a somersault referred to in Portuguese as a "mortal" ("leap of death"), similar to that of Obafemi Martins and Lomana LuaLua. The celebration derived from Nani's background in capoeira, which he used to practice as a child. For a while, it was reported that United manager Sir Alex Ferguson had banned Nani's celebration due to fear for his safety. However, Nani denounced the reports in August 2007, stating it was "not true" and that "Ferguson has never spoken to me about this subject and I am going to continue to celebrate goals in this way. The conversations he has had with me are normal conversations, like he has with all players".

== Career statistics ==
=== Club ===
As of match played on 31 October 2026

Appearances and goals by club, season and competition
Club	Season	League			National cup (Note: Includes Taça de Portugal, FA Cup, Turkish Cup, Copa del Rey, Coppa Italia, U.S. Open Cup, Australia Cup, Kazakhstan Cup)		League cup (Note: Includes Taça da Liga, Football League Cup, MLS Cup playoffs)		Continental		Other		Total	
Club	Season	Division	Apps	Goals	Apps	Goals	Apps	Goals	Apps	Goals	Apps	Goals	Apps	Goals
Sporting CP	2005–06	Primeira Liga	29	4	5	1	—		2 (Note: One appearance in UEFA Champions League, one appearance in UEFA Cup)	0	—		36	5
Sporting CP	2006–07	Primeira Liga	29	5	5	0	—		6 (Note: Appearance(s) in UEFA Champions League)	1	—		40	6
Sporting CP	Total		58	9	10	1	—		8	1	—		76	11
Manchester United	2007–08	Premier League	26	3	2	1	1	0	11	0	1 (Note: Appearance in FA Community Shield)	0	41	4
Manchester United	2008–09	Premier League	13	1	2	2	6	3	7	0	3 (Note: One appearance in FA Community Shield, one appearance in UEFA Super Cup, one appearance in FIFA Club World Cup)	0	31	6
Manchester United	2009–10	Premier League	23	3	0	0	2	0	8	2	1	1	34	6
Manchester United	2010–11	Premier League	33	9	3	0	0	0	12	1	1	0	49	10
Manchester United	2011–12	Premier League	29	8	1	0	0	0	9 (Note: Six appearances in UEFA Champions League, three appearances in UEFA Europa League)	0	1	2	40	10
Manchester United	2012–13	Premier League	11	1	5	1	1	1	4	0	—		21	3
Manchester United	2013–14	Premier League	11	0	0	0	1	0	1	1	0	0	13	1
Manchester United	2014–15	Premier League	1	0	0	0	0	0	—		—		1	0
Manchester United	Total		147	25	13	4	11	4	52	4	7	3	230	40
Sporting CP (loan)	2014–15	Primeira Liga	27	7	3	1	0	0	7 (Note: Five appearances and four goals in UEFA Champions League, two appearances in UEFA Europa League)	4	—		37	12
Fenerbahçe	2015–16	Süper Lig	28	8	6	3	—		13 (Note: Two appearances in UEFA Champions League, eleven appearances and one goal in UEFA Europa League)	1	—		47	12
Valencia	2016–17	La Liga	25	5	1	0	—		—		—		26	5
Lazio (loan)	2017–18	Serie A	18	3	1	0	—		6 (Note: Appearances in UEFA Europa League)	0	—		25	3
Sporting CP	2018–19	Primeira Liga	18	7	3	1	2	0	5	1	—		28	9
Orlando City	2019	MLS	30	12	3	0	—		—		—		33	12
Orlando City	2020	MLS	19 (Note: Includes three appearances and one goal in the MLS is Back Tournament group stage)	6	—		2	1	—		4 (Note: Appearances in MLS is Back Tournament)	2	25	9
Orlando City	2021	MLS	28	10	—		1	0	1 (Note: Appearance in Leagues Cup)	0	—		30	10
Orlando City	Total		77	28	3	0	3	1	1	0	4	2	88	31
Venezia	2021–22	Serie A	10	0	—		—		—		—		10	0
Melbourne Victory	2022–23	A-League	10	0	1	0	—		—		—		11	0
Adana Demirspor	2023–24	Süper Lig	28	4	1	0	—		5 (Note: Appearances in UEFA Europa Conference League)	0	—		34	4
Estrela Amadora	2024–25	Primeira Liga	9	1	1	0	—		—		—		10	1
FC Aktobe	2026	Kazakhstan Premier League	24	1	2	2	—		—		—		26	3
Career total			479	98	45	12	16	5	97	11	11	5	650	131

=== International ===
Appearances and goals by national team and year
National team	Year	Apps	Goals
Portugal	2006	4	1
Portugal	2007	7	1
Portugal	2008	11	3
Portugal	2009	11	1
Portugal	2010	7	3
Portugal	2011	10	3
Portugal	2012	14	1
Portugal	2013	8	1
Portugal	2014	11	1
Portugal	2015	9	2
Portugal	2016	14	6
Portugal	2017	6	1
Total		112	24

Portugal score listed first, score column indicates score after each Nani goal.

International goals by date, venue, cap, opponent, score, result and competition
No.	Date	Venue	Cap	Opponent	Score	Result	Competition
1	1 September 2006	Brøndby Stadium, Copenhagen, Denmark	1	Denmark	2–2	2–4	Friendly
2	2 June 2007	King Baudouin Stadium, Brussels, Belgium	6	Belgium	1–0	2–1	UEFA Euro 2008 qualifying
3	20 August 2008	Estádio Municipal de Aveiro, Aveiro, Portugal	17	Faroe Islands	5–0	5–0	Friendly
4	6 September 2008	Ta' Qali National Stadium, Attard, Malta	18	Malta	4–0	4–0	2010 FIFA World Cup qualification
5	10 September 2008	Estádio José Alvalade, Lisbon, Portugal	19	Denmark	1–0	2–3	2010 FIFA World Cup qualification
6	14 October 2009	Estádio D. Afonso Henriques, Guimarães, Portugal	31	Malta	1–0	4–0	2010 FIFA World Cup qualification
7	1 June 2010	Complexo Desportivo da Covilhã, Covilhã, Portugal	36	Cameroon	3–1	3–1	Friendly
8	8 October 2010	Estádio do Dragão, Porto, Portugal	39	Denmark	1–0	3–1	UEFA Euro 2012 qualifying
9	8 October 2010	Estádio do Dragão, Porto, Portugal	39	Denmark	2–0	3–1	UEFA Euro 2012 qualifying
10	7 October 2011	Estádio do Dragão, Porto, Portugal	48	Iceland	1–0	5–3	UEFA Euro 2012 qualifying
11	7 October 2011	Estádio do Dragão, Porto, Portugal	48	Iceland	2–0	5–3	UEFA Euro 2012 qualifying
12	15 November 2011	Estádio da Luz, Lisbon, Portugal	51	Bosnia and Herzegovina	2–0	6–2	UEFA Euro 2012 qualifying
13	2 June 2012	Estádio da Luz, Lisbon, Portugal	54	Turkey	1–2	1–3	Friendly
14	15 October 2013	Estádio Cidade de Coimbra, Coimbra, Portugal	70	Luxembourg	2–0	3–0	2014 FIFA World Cup qualification
15	22 June 2014	Arena da Amazônia, Manaus, Brazil	77	United States	1–0	2–2	2014 FIFA World Cup
16	11 October 2015	Partizan Stadium, Belgrade, Serbia	90	Serbia	1–0	2–1	UEFA Euro 2016 qualifying
17	17 November 2015	Stade Josy Barthel, Luxembourg, Luxembourg	92	Luxembourg	2–0	2–0	Friendly
18	29 March 2016	Estádio Dr. Magalhães Pessoa, Leiria, Portugal	94	Belgium	1–0	2–1	Friendly
19	14 June 2016	Stade Geoffroy-Guichard, Saint-Étienne, France	97	Iceland	1–0	1–1	UEFA Euro 2016
20	22 June 2016	Parc Olympique Lyonnais, Lyon, France	99	Hungary	1–1	3–3	UEFA Euro 2016
21	6 July 2016	Parc Olympique Lyonnais, Lyon, France	102	Wales	2–0	2–0	UEFA Euro 2016
22	1 September 2016	Estádio do Bessa, Porto, Portugal	104	Gibraltar	1–0	5–0	Friendly
23	1 September 2016	Estádio do Bessa, Porto, Portugal	104	Gibraltar	2–0	5–0	Friendly
24	24 June 2017	Krestovsky Stadium, Saint Petersburg, Russia	110	New Zealand	4–0	4–0	2017 FIFA Confederations Cup

== Honours ==
Sporting CP

- Taça de Portugal: 2006–07, 2014–15, 2018–19
- Taça da Liga: 2018–19

Manchester United

- Premier League: 2007–08, 2008–09, 2010–11, 2012–13
- Football League Cup: 2008–09, 2009–10
- FA Community Shield: 2007, 2008, 2010, 2011
- UEFA Champions League: 2007–08
- FIFA Club World Cup: 2008

Portugal

- UEFA European Championship: 2016

Individual

- SJPF Young Player of the Month: May 2007
- PFA Team of the Year: 2010–11 Premier League
- Premier League top assist provider: 2010–11
- Manchester United Players' Player of the Year: 2010–11
- SJPF Player of the Month: October/November 2014
- Sporting CP Footballer of the Year: 2015
- MLS All-Star: 2019, 2021

Orders

- Commander of the Order of Merit

== See also ==
- List of footballers with 100 or more caps
