= 2009 FA Community Shield =

- The match programme cover
Chelsea	Manchester United
2	2
- Chelsea won 4–1 on penalties
- Date: 9 August 2009
- Venue: Wembley Stadium, London
- Man of the Match: Ricardo Carvalho (Chelsea)
- Referee: Chris Foy (Merseyside)
- Attendance: 85,896
- Weather: Sunny

The 2009 FA Community Shield (also known as The FA Community Shield sponsored by McDonald's for sponsorship reasons) was the 87th FA Community Shield, an annual football match contested by the winners of the previous season's Premier League and FA Cup competitions. The match was contested at Wembley Stadium, London, on 9 August 2009, and contested by 2008–09 Premier League champions Manchester United, and Chelsea as the winners of the 2008–09 FA Cup, a repeat of the 2007 match. The game ended in a 2–2 draw – the goals coming from Nani and Wayne Rooney for Manchester United, and from Ricardo Carvalho and Frank Lampard for Chelsea – with Chelsea winning 4–1 on penalties.

This was also the first time since 1998 that Chelsea had won a professional match on penalties; The last instance was a League Cup quarter-final against Ipswich Town.

== Match details ==
9 August 2009
15:00 BST

Chelsea	2–2	Manchester United
Carvalho 52'; Lampard 70'	Report	Nani 10'; Rooney 90+2'
Penalties
Lampard (penalty scored); Ballack (penalty scored); Drogba (penalty scored); Kalou (penalty scored)	4–1	(penalty missed) Giggs; (penalty scored) Carrick; (penalty missed) Evra

Wembley Stadium, London
Attendance: 85,896
Referee: Chris Foy (Merseyside)

Chelsea	Manchester United

GK	1	(Czech Republic) Petr Čech
RB	2	(Serbia) Branislav Ivanović	(yellow card) 13'	(substituted off) 46'
CB	6	(Portugal) Ricardo Carvalho
CB	26	(England) John Terry (c)
LB	3	(England) Ashley Cole
DM	12	(Nigeria) Mikel John Obi		(substituted off) 65'
RM	5	(Ghana) Michael Essien
LM	15	(France) Florent Malouda		(substituted off) 78'
AM	8	(England) Frank Lampard
CF	39	(France) Nicolas Anelka		(substituted off) 84'
CF	11	(Ivory Coast) Didier Drogba
Substitutes:
GK	40	(Portugal) Hilário
DF	17	(Portugal) José Bosingwa		(substituted on) 46'
DF	33	(Brazil) Alex
DF	35	(Brazil) Juliano Belletti
MF	13	(Germany) Michael Ballack		(substituted on) 65'
MF	20	(Portugal) Deco		(substituted on) 78'
FW	21	(Ivory Coast) Salomon Kalou		(substituted on) 84'
Manager:
(Italy) Carlo Ancelotti

GK	12	(England) Ben Foster
RB	22	(Republic of Ireland) John O'Shea		(substituted off) 75'
CB	5	(England) Rio Ferdinand (c)
CB	23	(Northern Ireland) Jonny Evans
LB	3	(France) Patrice Evra	(yellow card) 80'
RM	17	(Portugal) Nani		(substituted off) 63'
CM	24	(Scotland) Darren Fletcher		(substituted off) 75'
CM	16	(England) Michael Carrick
LM	13	(South Korea) Park Ji-sung		(substituted off) 75'
CF	10	(England) Wayne Rooney
CF	9	(Bulgaria) Dimitar Berbatov	(yellow card) 4'	(substituted off) 75'
Substitutes:
GK	29	(Poland) Tomasz Kuszczak
DF	20	(Brazil) Fábio		(substituted on) 75'
MF	11	(Wales) Ryan Giggs		(substituted on) 75'
MF	18	(England) Paul Scholes		(substituted on) 75'
MF	25	(Ecuador) Antonio Valencia		(substituted on) 63'
MF	28	(Republic of Ireland) Darron Gibson
FW	7	(England) Michael Owen	(yellow card) 86'	(substituted on) 75'
Manager:
(Scotland) Sir Alex Ferguson

Match officials

- Assistant referees:
  - Philip Sharp (Hertfordshire)
  - Simon Beck (Essex)
- Fourth official: Lee Mason (Lancashire)

Man of the match

- Ricardo Carvalho (Chelsea)

Match rules

- 90 minutes.
- Penalty shoot-out if scores level after 90 minutes.
- Seven named substitutes.
- Maximum of six substitutions.

== See also ==
- 2008–09 Premier League
- 2008–09 FA Cup
