= Gladestony =

Brazilian footballer (born 1993)

Personal information
- Full name: Gladestony Estevão Paulino da Silva
- Date of birth: 5 August 1993 (age 33)
- Place of birth: Bebedouro, Brazil
- Height: 1.83 m (6 ft 0 in)
- Position: Midfielder

Team information
- Current team: Fidelis Andria

Youth career
- 2008: Santos
- 2009–2012: Desportivo Brasil
- 2011: → Icasa (loan)
- 2011: → Manchester United (loan)
- 2011–2012: → Twente (loan)
- 2012: → São Paulo (loan)

Senior career*
Years	Team	Apps	(Gls)
2011–2014	Desportivo Brasil	0	(0)
2011	→ Icasa (loan)	1	(0)
2013	→ São Paulo (loan)	0	(0)
2013–2014	→ Estoril (loan)	0	(0)
2014	→ Internacional (loan)	1	(0)
2015	Audax	3	(0)
2015–2017	Estoril	0	(0)
2016–2017	→ Cartagena (loan)	4	(0)
2017	Catania	7	(1)
2017	→ Messina (loan)	14	(3)
2018–2019	Pro Vercelli	18	(2)
2019–2020	Siena	17	(1)
2020–2021	Seregno	20	(5)
2021–2024	Giugliano	93	(13)
2024–	Fidelis Andria	1	(0)
- * Club domestic league appearances and goals as of 5 May 2024

Gladestony Estevão Paulino da Silva (born 5 August 1993), simply known as Gladestony, is a Brazilian footballer who plays as a central midfielder for Italian Serie D Group H club Fidelis Andria.

== Club career ==
Born in Bebedouro, São Paulo, Gladestony started his career at Santos in 2008, but moved to Desportivo Brasil in the following year, as a part of a partnership with Manchester United. After a year at Icasa, he moved to the English powerhouse, being subsequently loaned to FC Twente; he was also close friends with Paul Pogba during his spell at the Red Devils.

On 21 September 2012, Gladestony joined São Paulo, being promoted to the main squad in February the following year. He left the club on 5 July 2013, after making no senior appearances, and signed for Estoril Praia.

After being rarely used (only one UEFA Europa League and one Taça de Portugal match), Gladestony returned to his home country in December, and signed a one-year deal with Internacional. He made his Série A debut on 27 April 2014, coming on as a second-half substitute for Alan Patrick in a 2–2 away draw against Botafogo.

On 13 July 2015, Gladestony returned to Estoril, after agreeing to a two-year deal. After being released by Catania on 17 November 2017, he joined Pro Vercelli on 3 January 2018.

On 13 July 2019, he signed a 2-year contract with Siena.

On 11 August 2020 he joined Serie D club Seregno.

On 5 August 2021, he moved to Giugliano, also in Serie D. Giugliano was promoted to Serie C for the 2022–23 season.
