= 2012–13 Manchester United F.C. season =

English football club season

Manchester United
2012–13 season
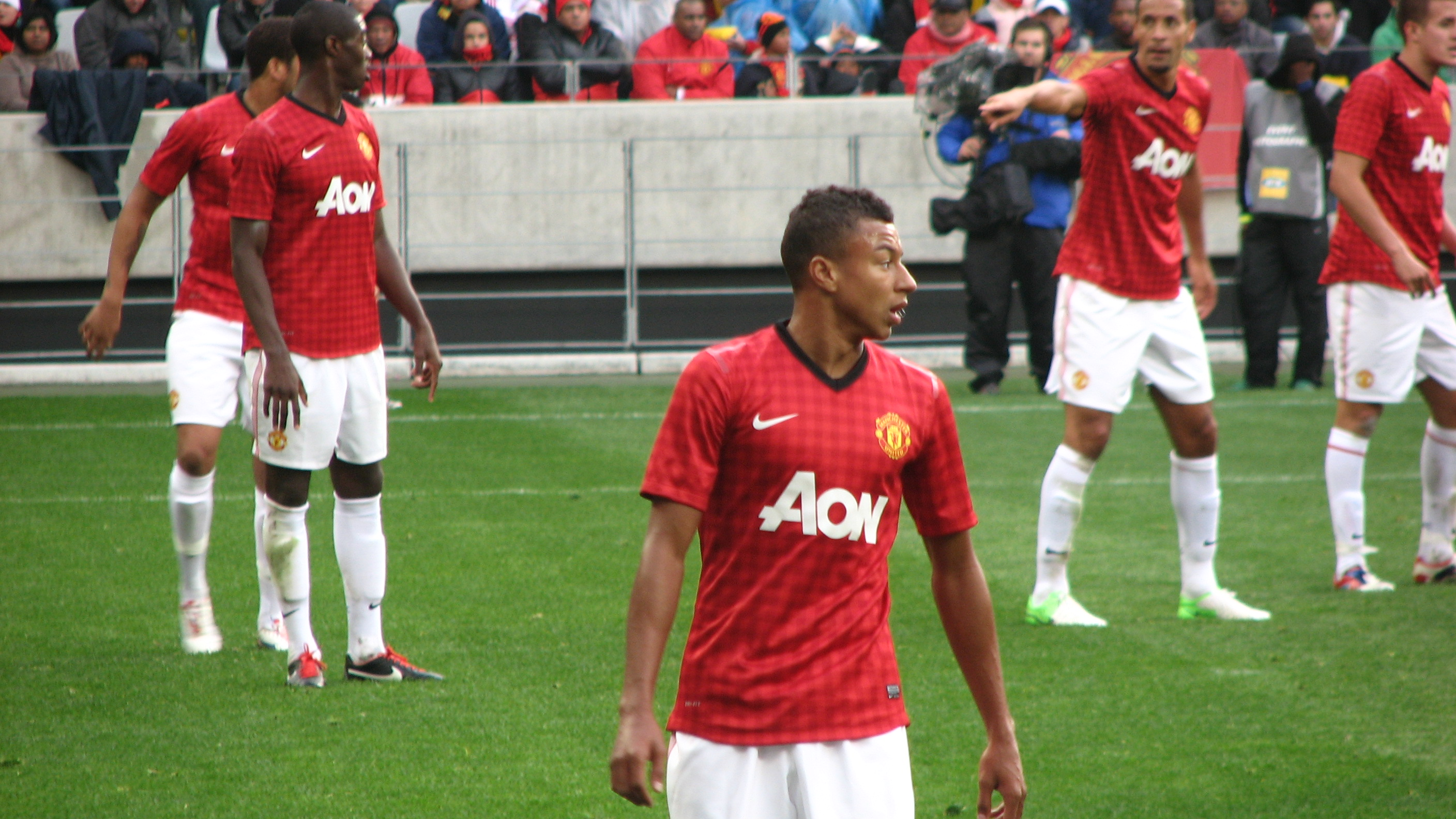
- Manchester United players during a pre-season match against Ajax Cape Town in July 2012
- Co-chairmen: Joel and Avram Glazer
- Manager: Sir Alex Ferguson
- Stadium: Old Trafford
- Premier League: 1st
- FA Cup: Sixth round
- League Cup: Fourth round
- UEFA Champions League: Round of 16
- Top goalscorer: League: Robin van Persie (26); All: Robin van Persie (30)
- Highest home attendance: 75,605 (vs. Reading, 16 March)
- Lowest home attendance: 46,358 (vs. Newcastle United, 26 September)
- Average home league attendance: 75,530
Home colours	Away colours	Third colours

The 2012–13 season was Manchester United's 21st season in the Premier League, and their 38th consecutive season in the top flight of English football.

United's season began on 20 August 2012 with the first game of the Premier League campaign. After narrowly missing out on goal difference the previous season, they won an unprecedented 20th English top-flight title on 22 April 2013 with a win over Aston Villa at Old Trafford, in which top scorer Robin van Persie scored a hat-trick, finishing the season with 26 league goals and 30 goals in all competitions. This remains the most recent season in which the club won a Premier League title.

United competed in two domestic cups, the FA Cup and the League Cup, where they entered both tournaments in the Third Round courtesy of their league position. Chelsea proved to be United's nemesis in both competitions, first beating them 5–4 in the fourth round of the League Cup on 31 October 2012, followed by a 1–0 win in the FA Cup sixth round replay on 1 April 2013.

In Europe, United were knocked out of the Champions League at the Round of 16 stage after losing 3–2 on aggregate to Real Madrid.

On 8 May 2013, United's long-time manager, Sir Alex Ferguson, announced that he would retire from his position as manager after 26 1/2 years in charge, making him the longest-serving manager of any English club by this stage. He had won 38 trophies during that time – more than any other manager in the history of football – and at 71 was the oldest serving manager currently in the Premier League or Football League. The next day, Manchester United announced that David Moyes of Everton would take over from Ferguson at the beginning of the 2013–14 season.

== Pre-season and friendlies ==
Manchester United preceded their 2012–13 campaign with a global tour, including trips to South Africa for the first time since 2008, China for the first time since 2009 and Norway for the first time since 2002. The tour began with matches against South African teams AmaZulu on 18 July 2012 and Ajax Cape Town on 21 July 2012. They then travelled to China to play Shanghai Shenhua on 25 July 2012 at the Shanghai Stadium, before moving on to Norway to play Vålerenga at the Ullevaal Stadion in Oslo on 5 August, and Sweden to play Spanish side Barcelona at Ullevi, Gothenburg, on 8 August 2012. The final game of the pre-season tour was against Hannover 96 (whom they had not played since 1965) at the AWD-Arena on 11 August 2012.

Date	Opponents	H / A	Result F–A	Scorers	Attendance
18 July 2012	AmaZulu	A	1–0	Macheda 20'	
21 July 2012	Ajax Cape Town	A	1–1	Bebé 90+2'	
25 July 2012	Shanghai Shenhua	N	1–0	Kagawa 68'	42,725
5 August 2012	Vålerenga	A	0–0		
8 August 2012	Barcelona	N	0–0 (0–2p)		47,141
11 August 2012	Hannover 96	A	4–3	Hernández 31', Rooney (2) 69', 82', Kagawa 85'	35,800

== Premier League ==
The fixtures for the 2012–13 league season were announced on 18 June at 09:00 BST. Manchester United began their Premier League campaign with a 1–0 defeat at Goodison Park to Everton on 20 August 2012, with Marouane Fellaini scoring the only goal in the 57th minute. It was the first time United had lost their opening league fixture since 2004.

United then returned to Old Trafford where they played against Fulham. The game started with Fulham taking the lead in third minute through a Damien Duff goal, a goal which marked Fulham's first goal at Old Trafford since 2006. United levelled the game seven minutes later through a spectacular volley from Robin van Persie who scored his first goal for United after joining the team a week before. United then took the lead in the 35th minute through Shinji Kagawa who, like Van Persie, scored his first United goal. Rafael made the scoreline 3–1 just five minutes before half-time. In the second-half Fulham managed to reduce United's lead after an own goal by United defender Nemanja Vidić, who collided with goalkeeper David de Gea and back-heeled the ball into the net.

United's next game was against Southampton at St Mary's Stadium. The hosts took a shock 1–0 lead through Rickie Lambert, before Van Persie equalised for United. In the second half, Morgan Schneiderlin gave the hosts the lead again, before United were awarded a penalty after Jos Hooiveld fouled Van Persie; his spot kick was saved by Southampton goalkeeper Kelvin Davis. In the 87th minute, Van Persie atoned for his penalty miss by scoring his second goal of the game, before heading in a stoppage time winner from Nani's corner, completing his hat-trick.

In the next game, United thrashed Wigan 4–0 with summer signings Alexander Büttner and Nick Powell scoring their first goals. Hernández and Scholes also got on the scoresheet. United's next game was against archrivals Liverpool. Liverpool took the lead but United fought back with goals from Rafael and a penalty from Van Persie and won the game 2–1. United then suffered a 3–2 loss at the hands of Tottenham, who took a 2–0 lead. At half-time, Wayne Rooney made his return and contributed with an assist, but Tottenham held on take victory.

The next match saw Manchester United beat Newcastle United 3–0 at St James' Park. Goals from Jonny Evans and Patrice Evra, both headed from corners gave United a 2–0 lead before Tom Cleverley scored a curling screamer from 25 yards. The next match saw United win 4–2 against Stoke City, Wayne Rooney scored an own goal in the 11th minute before equalising in the 28th minute. Van Persie gave United the lead just before the break, and Danny Welbeck's diving header gave United a two-goal advantage before Michael Kightly cut the margin in the 58th minute. Seven minutes later, Wayne Rooney scored to restore Man Utd's two-goal lead and win the game 4–2.

United then played title rivals Chelsea at Stamford Bridge, a stadium where they had not won in the last 10 years. Prior to kick-off, Chelsea were four points clear at the top of the table; a win would see extend their lead to seven points. United struck twice in the opening 12 minutes; the first occasion being an own goal by David Luiz after Robin van Persie's shot hit the post and bounced off the Brazilian, and then the Dutchman himself scored the second. Just before half time, Juan Mata scored a free kick to bring Chelsea back into the game, before Ramires equalised for the hosts ten minutes after the break. Branislav Ivanović was shown the red card for a foul near the area, and nine minutes later, Fernando Torres received a second yellow for diving. Substitute Hernández scored the goal that saw the visitors emerge victorious, and the gap at the top of the table close to one point.

The next game was at Old Trafford against rivals Arsenal, in which Van Persie scored against his former club within three minutes of the start. Wayne Rooney missed a penalty just before half time, but Patrice Evra doubled United's lead after heading Rooney's cross into the net. Santi Cazorla scored a late consolation goal for Arsenal. An away visit to Aston Villa turned out to be a thrilling game which saw Andreas Weimann score a brace to send the hosts 2–0 up, before substitute Hernández scored twice and assisted an own goal that gave United the victory. Although he claimed the match ball at the end of the game, replays showed that United's second goal was an own goal by Ron Vlaar.

United suffered their third defeat of the season away to Norwich City, losing 1–0, with the only goal coming from former Manchester United youth Anthony Pilkington. United then entertained Queens Park Rangers and fell behind after 52 minutes. However, they responded strongly with Jonny Evans and Darren Fletcher both netting from Wayne Rooney corners. Hernández scored the third goal to make the points safe. United then had visiting West Ham United as their next rivals. United won the match 1–0 thanks to an early Van Persie goal after just 31 seconds that deflected over Jussi Jääskeläinen.

United established a three-point lead at the top of the table after edging a seven-goal thriller against Reading at Madejski Stadium. Hal Robson-Kanu lashed home the opener, then Anderson cracked in an equaliser and Wayne Rooney slid home a penalty before Adam Le Fondre and Sean Morrison quickly headed in from corners to have the hosts 3–2 up by 23 minutes. Despite the defensive lapses, Manchester United fought back through an irresistible attacking display, and Rooney clinically turned in Patrice Evra's cross to level again, before turning provider for Robin van Persie to spring the hosts' offside trap and beat Adam Federici to make it 3–4 in 34 minutes. United held on to the lead in a nervous second half to win the match.

Their next match saw United face city rivals and closest contenders Manchester City at the Etihad Stadium. Wayne Rooney scored two goals in the opening half hour. In the second half, Ashley Young scored a goal that was ruled out for offside, and Yaya Touré pulled one back for City moments later. Pablo Zabaleta would level the score from a corner in the 86th minute. In the dying minutes of the game, Robin van Persie dispatched a free kick deflected off Samir Nasri to give United the lead and send them six points clear at the summit.

In their next match, United faced Sunderland at Old Trafford and goals from Robin van Persie and Tom Cleverley gave United a two-goal lead at half-time before Wayne Rooney gave United a three-goal advantage in the second half. Fraizer Campbell scored the only goal for the visitors, heading in Stéphane Sessègnon's cross. United held on to win the game 3–1. United then played Swansea City at the Liberty Stadium. Patrice Evra headed the Reds in front before Swansea striker Michu netted his 13th goal of the season in a see-sawing first half. In the 74th minute, a fight ensued when Swansea captain Ashley Williams kicked a ball which struck the back of Robin van Persie's head after he had been fouled by Nathan Dyer. The game ended as a 1–1 draw, United's first of the season, but it was enough to ensure a four-point lead at the top of the table on Christmas Day. In the post-match interview, Sir Alex Ferguson described the incident between Van Persie and Williams as "the most dangerous thing he had seen on a football field", and claimed that Van Persie "could've been killed". He also called for the FA to ban Williams, but no action was taken.

Manchester United played Newcastle United at Old Trafford on Boxing Day in what turned out to be a classic. United conceded first when James Perch scored for Newcastle in the fourth minute. Jonny Evans then scored for both teams in quick succession, first equalising for United before putting through his own net to restore Newcastle's lead; the goal was originally ruled out for offside against Papiss Cissé, who was lurking behind Evans, but referee Mike Dean allowed it to stand, having deemed that Cissé was not interfering with play. Patrice Evra scored close to the hour mark to make the scores level with a 25-yard strike to mark his best season in terms of goals. Papiss Cissé then scored with a sublime finish to make it 3–2 on 68 minutes, only for Robin van Persie to get United's third equaliser three minutes later. Then United did what they do best with Javier Hernández dramatically scoring a winner with just seconds of the 90 minutes left to win the game 4–3. With Manchester City losing away at Sunderland, United extended their lead at the top to seven points.

United then played West Bromwich Albion at Old Trafford, making five changes to the side that played on Boxing Day with Shinji Kagawa returning to the side behind Danny Welbeck. Ashley Young's drilled cross was deflected off Gareth McAuley into his own net in the ninth minute for United's opener. Later in injury time, substitute Robin van Persie scored a wonderful curling shot assisted by Antonio Valencia to make it 2–0.

United then played Wigan Athletic at the DW Stadium, making three changes to the side that beat West Brom. Javier Hernández latched onto a rebound from Patrice Evra's shot and Robin van Persie rounded Iván Ramis and converted before half time. In the second half, Hernández smashed a volley after a blocked Van Persie free kick. Van Persie himself scored the fourth goal after receiving a short-driving cross from Danny Welbeck from the left hand side of the post to make it 4–0. The game was their fifth clean sheet in the league so far this season. United's next game was against arch-rivals Liverpool. Van Persie made it 1–0 and Evra's header which touched Vidić's head made it 2–0. Liverpool pulled one back but it was not enough. United then drew against Tottenham, Van Persie again opened the scoring with a header but Tottenham equalised in the dying moments of the game through Clint Dempsey.

In the next game, United played Southampton at home. After going 1–0 down within three minutes, United once again pulled it back with two goals from Wayne Rooney in the first half to win 2–1. After their midweek home win, United then travelled to London to play Fulham where the deadlock was finally broken by a goal from Rooney in the 79th minute. United held on for the 1–0 win to go nine points clear at the top of the table. United then capitalised on the defeat of their nearest neighbours and closest rivals at Southampton the day before by beating Everton 2–0 at Old Trafford to extend their lead at the top of the table to twelve points with goals from Ryan Giggs early in the first half and Van Persie just before half time and avenging the 1–0 defeat they suffered in their first match of the season.

After that Manchester United travelled to Loftus Road and had it easy with a 2–0 win over QPR where Rafael scored a 30-yard screamer and Giggs scored a clinical finish on his 999th appearance. This meant that Manchester United have opened up a 15-point lead, though this was reduced to 12 after Manchester City won 2–0 over Chelsea. Next, Manchester United hosted Norwich City at the "Theatre of Dreams" and again opened up a 15-point lead with a 4–0 win. Kagawa scored a hat-trick, becoming the first Asian player to do so in the Premier League.

On 16 March, Manchester United took advantage of their neighbours and closest title rivals Manchester City's loss to Everton earlier in the day by beating Reading. The game finished 1–0 from a deflected goal by Wayne Rooney after a surging run from Rio Ferdinand. This extended Manchester United's lead to 15 points with nine games to play. After the international break, United faced a trip to the Stadium of Light to play Sunderland on 30 March. Again United won 1–0 thanks to a Titus Bramble own goal after Van Persie's shot had deflected off him. By winning, United set a new record by winning 25 of their opening 30 games.

On 8 April, Manchester United returned to Old Trafford to play their second Manchester derby, where United were handed their first loss in 18 games after City won 2–1. James Milner scored the first for City with a deflected drive, but United equalised after Phil Jones headed a Van Persie free-kick against Vincent Kompany. Sergio Agüero, however, scored at the near post after a mazy run. United bounced back from derby disappointment by beating Stoke City at the Britannia Stadium. Michael Carrick scored a toe poke from a corner in the second minute and a late Van Persie penalty secured the points for United. Van Persie also ended his barren run of nine games without a goal.

Manchester United had to play a midweek fixture away to West Ham. This was a tough game that saw the hosts go ahead twice through Ricardo Vaz Tê and Mohamed Diamé, but United equalised twice through Antonio Valencia, who netted his first goal of the season, and Robin van Persie. The game ended 2–2.

On 22 April, Manchester United beat Aston Villa 3–0 to win their 13th Premier League title and 20th English championship after Manchester City had lost to Tottenham the day before. In the second minute, Robin van Persie scored after a lay-off from Ryan Giggs to make the score 1–0. Van Persie scored again in the 13th minute with a volley from a through ball over the top by Wayne Rooney. Sir Alex Ferguson and many others hailed it as one of the goals of the season. In the 33rd minute, Van Persie completed his hat-trick with another assist from Giggs. United clinched their 20th league title and Sir Alex Ferguson clinched his 13th title with United.

On 28 April, Manchester United travelled to the Emirates Stadium to face Arsenal, where they were given a guard of honour, although Van Persie received a torrid reception by fans of his former club. Arsenal scored first through a Theo Walcott goal in the second minute that was claimed to be offside. United scored at the end of the first half through a Van Persie penalty after the striker was fouled by Bacary Sagna. Both teams had chances to score in the second half but neither did and the score finished 1–1.

United then faced Chelsea at Old Trafford, recording their third-straight defeat to the Blues in the season after losing 1–0, courtesy of an own goal by Phil Jones. A week later, Sir Alex Ferguson managed his last game at Old Trafford against Swansea. United took the lead through Javier Hernández, but conceded a strike from Michu in the 52nd minute. Quite oddly, it was Rio Ferdinand who scored the winner with three minutes to go, smashing home a Van Persie corner. Ferguson retired with dignity as he and his team received their medals.

Ferguson's last game in charge was against West Bromwich at The Hawthorns. Despite taking a 5–2 lead, they couldn't hold on to it and drew 5–5, setting a record for the first match in the Premier League in which both teams scored five goals each.

Date	Opponents	H / A	Result F–A	Scorers	Attendance	League position
20 August 2012	Everton	A	0–1		38,415	16th
25 August 2012	Fulham	H	3–2	Van Persie 10', Kagawa 35', Rafael 41'	75,352	7th
2 September 2012	Southampton	A	3–2	Van Persie (3) 23', 87', 90+2'	31,609	5th
15 September 2012	Wigan Athletic	H	4–0	Scholes 51', Hernández 63', Büttner 66', Powell 82'	75,142	2nd
23 September 2012	Liverpool	A	2–1	Rafael 51', Van Persie 81' (pen.)	44,263	2nd
29 September 2012	Tottenham Hotspur	H	2–3	Nani 51', Kagawa 53'	75,566	3rd
7 October 2012	Newcastle United	A	3–0	Evans 8', Evra 15', Cleverley 71'	52,203	2nd
20 October 2012	Stoke City	H	4–2	Rooney (2) 27', 65', Van Persie 44', Welbeck 46'	75,585	2nd
28 October 2012	Chelsea	A	3–2	Luiz 4' (o.g.), Van Persie 12', Hernández 75'	41,644	2nd
3 November 2012	Arsenal	H	2–1	Van Persie 3', Evra 67'	75,492	1st
10 November 2012	Aston Villa	A	3–2	Hernández (2) 58', 87', Vlaar 63' (o.g.)	40,538	1st
17 November 2012	Norwich City	A	0–1		26,840	2nd
24 November 2012	Queens Park Rangers	H	3–1	Evans 64', Fletcher 68', Hernández 72'	75,603	1st
28 November 2012	West Ham United	H	1–0	Van Persie 1'	75,572	1st
1 December 2012	Reading	A	4–3	Anderson 13', Rooney (2) 16' (pen.), 30', Van Persie 34'	24,095	1st
9 December 2012	Manchester City	A	3–2	Rooney (2) 16', 29', Van Persie 90+2'	47,166	1st
15 December 2012	Sunderland	H	3–1	Van Persie 16', Cleverley 19', Rooney 59'	75,582	1st
23 December 2012	Swansea City	A	1–1	Evra 16'	20,650	1st
26 December 2012	Newcastle United	H	4–3	Evans 25', Evra 58', Van Persie 71', Hernández 90'	75,596	1st
29 December 2012	West Bromwich Albion	H	2–0	McAuley 9' (o.g.), Van Persie 90'	75,595	1st
1 January 2013	Wigan Athletic	A	4–0	Hernández (2) 35', 63', Van Persie (2) 43', 88'	20,342	1st
13 January 2013	Liverpool	H	2–1	Van Persie 19', Vidić 54'	75,501	1st
20 January 2013	Tottenham Hotspur	A	1–1	Van Persie 25'	35,956	1st
30 January 2013	Southampton	H	2–1	Rooney (2) 8', 27'	75,600	1st
2 February 2013	Fulham	A	1–0	Rooney 79'	25,670	1st
10 February 2013	Everton	H	2–0	Giggs 13', Van Persie 45+1'	75,525	1st
23 February 2013	Queens Park Rangers	A	2–0	Rafael 23', Giggs 80'	18,337	1st
2 March 2013	Norwich City	H	4–0	Kagawa (3) 45+1', 76', 87', Rooney 90'	75,586	1st
16 March 2013	Reading	H	1–0	Rooney 21'	75,605	1st
30 March 2013	Sunderland	A	1–0	Bramble 27' (o.g.)	43,760	1st
8 April 2013	Manchester City	H	1–2	Kompany 59' (o.g.)	75,498	1st
14 April 2013	Stoke City	A	2–0	Carrick 4', Van Persie 66' (pen.)	27,191	1st
17 April 2013	West Ham United	A	2–2	Valencia 31', Van Persie 77'	34,692	1st
22 April 2013	Aston Villa	H	3–0	Van Persie (3) 2', 13', 33'	75,591	1st
28 April 2013	Arsenal	A	1–1	Van Persie 44' (pen.)	60,112	1st
5 May 2013	Chelsea	H	0–1		75,500	1st
12 May 2013	Swansea City	H	2–1	Hernández 39', Ferdinand 87'	75,572	1st
19 May 2013	West Bromwich Albion	A	5–5	Kagawa 6', Olsson 9' (o.g.), Büttner 30', Van Persie 53', Hernández 63'	26,438	1st

Pos	Team	Pld	W	D	L	GF	GA	GD	Pts	Qualification or relegation
1	Manchester United (C)	38	28	5	5	86	43	+43	89	Qualification for the Champions League group stage
2	Manchester City	38	23	9	6	66	34	+32	78	Qualification for the Champions League group stage
3	Chelsea	38	22	9	7	75	39	+36	75	Qualification for the Champions League group stage
4	Arsenal	38	21	10	7	72	37	+35	73	Qualification for the Champions League play-off round
5	Tottenham Hotspur	38	21	9	8	66	46	+20	72	Qualification for the Europa League play-off round

Source: Barclays Premier League
Rules for classification: 1) Points; 2) Goal difference; 3) Goals scored; 4) Play-offs (only if needed to decide champion, teams for relegation or teams for UEFA competitions).
(C) Champions

== FA Cup ==
United entered the FA Cup at the Third Round stage with the other Premier League clubs, as well as those from the Championship. The draw was made on 2 December 2012, with the ties taking place on the weekend of 5–6 January 2013. United was drawn in an away match against West Ham United. The game ended in a 2–2 draw which meant United had to play against West Ham United again, this time at Old Trafford on 16 January 2013, beating them 1–0 in the process.

The draw for the fourth round took place on 6 January 2013, and gave United a home match on 26 January against Fulham, which United won 4–1.

The draw for the fifth round took place on 27 January 2013, and gave United another home match, this time against fellow Premier League club Reading. The game which was played on 18 February 2013 gave United a 2–1 win.

The draw for the sixth round took place on 17 February 2013, and gave United another home match, this time against fellow Premier League club Chelsea. The game which was played on 10 March 2013 ended in a 2–2 draw which meant United had to play against Chelsea again, this time at Stamford Bridge on 1 April. The game finished with United losing 1–0, meaning that United were knocked out, with Chelsea proceeding to face Manchester City in the semi-finals.

Date	Round	Opponents	H / A	Result F–A	Scorers	Attendance
5 January 2013	Round 3	West Ham United	A	2–2	Cleverley 23', Van Persie 90+1'	32,922
16 January 2013	Round 3 Replay	West Ham United	H	1–0	Rooney 9'	71,081
26 January 2013	Round 4	Fulham	H	4–1	Giggs 3' (pen.), Rooney 50', Hernández (2) 52', 66'	72,596
18 February 2013	Round 5	Reading	H	2–1	Nani 69', Hernández 72'	75,213
10 March 2013	Round 6	Chelsea	H	2–2	Hernández 5', Rooney 11'	75,196
1 April 2013	Round 6 Replay	Chelsea	A	0–1		40,704

== League Cup ==
As one of seven English clubs who qualified for European competition in the 2011–12 season, United received a bye to the Third Round of the League Cup. The draw took place on 30 August 2012, with United being paired with fellow Premier League club Newcastle United. United defeated Newcastle 2–1 on 26 September. Later that day they were drawn against Chelsea for their fourth-round match. The score was 3–3 at the end of 90 minutes, but Chelsea scored twice in extra time before Ryan Giggs' consolation penalty, giving Chelsea a 5–4 win.

Date	Round	Opponents	H / A	Result F–A	Scorers	Attendance
26 September 2012	Round 3	Newcastle United	H	2–1	Anderson 44', Cleverley 58'	46,358
31 October 2012	Round 4	Chelsea	A	4–5 (a.e.t.)	Giggs (2) 22', 120' (pen.), Hernández 43', Nani 59'	41,126

== UEFA Champions League ==
=== Group stage ===
Having finished in the top three in the league last season, United began their Champions League campaign in the group stage. Courtesy of their UEFA coefficient, they were seeded in Pot 1 for the draw, which took place in Monaco on 30 August 2012. United were drawn into Group H, along with Braga of Portugal, Turkish champions Galatasaray and Romanian champions CFR Cluj. Manchester United were previously drawn with Galatasaray in both 1993–94 and 1994–95, while Braga and CFR Cluj were new opponents.

United ensured qualification into the knockout stage on 7 November when they won away at Braga by a score of 3–1. United fell behind early in the second half when Braga was awarded a penalty as the result of a Jonny Evans challenge. Alan converted the penalty in the 49th minute to put the home side ahead. The match was halted for approximately 12 minutes due to the floodlights going out. When play resumed, Robin van Persie tied the match in the 80th minute with a long-range strike. United were then awarded a penalty in the 85th minute, which Wayne Rooney successfully converted. Javier Hernández then put the game away in stoppage time. With top spot in the group secured United, fielding younger squads, lost both of their final matches 1–0 to Galatasaray and CFR Cluj.

Date	Opponents	H / A	Result F–A	Scorers	Attendance	Group position
19 September 2012	Galatasaray	H	1–0	Carrick 7'	74,653	2nd
2 October 2012	CFR Cluj	A	2–1	Van Persie (2) 29', 49'	16,259	1st
23 October 2012	Braga	H	3–2	Hernández (2) 25', 75', Evans 62'	73,195	1st
7 November 2012	Braga	A	3–1	Van Persie 80', Rooney 85' (pen.), Hernández 90+2'	15,388	1st
20 November 2012	Galatasaray	A	0–1		50,278	1st
5 December 2012	CFR Cluj	H	0–1		71,521	1st

Pos	Team	Pld	W	D	L	GF	GA	GD	Pts	Qualification	MUN	GAL	CLJ	BRA
1	(England) Manchester United	6	4	0	2	9	6	+3	12	Advance to knockout phase	—	1–0	0–1	3–2
2	(Turkey) Galatasaray	6	3	1	2	7	6	+1	10 (Note: Head-to-head points: Galatasaray 4, CFR Cluj 1.)	Advance to knockout phase	1–0	—	1–1	0–2
3	(Romania) CFR Cluj	6	3	1	2	9	7	+2	10	Transfer to Europa League	1–2	1–3	—	3–1
4	(Portugal) Braga	6	1	0	5	7	13	−6	3		1–3	1–2	0–2	—

Source: Soccerway

=== Knockout phase ===
The draw for the round of 16 was made in Nyon, Switzerland, on 20 December 2012. The first leg was played on 13 February 2013 away from home, and the second leg was played on 5 March 2013 at Old Trafford. As winners of their group, United were drawn against defending Spanish league champions, Real Madrid, who finished as runners-up in Group D. It was fifth tie between the two famed clubs and the first time they have faced one another since 2003 when Real Madrid won the quarter-final tie 6–5 on aggregate. This also marked the first time United faced Cristiano Ronaldo since selling him to Madrid in 2009 for a record £80 million. In the first tie, United drew 1–1 away from home thanks to a goal by Danny Welbeck. In the second tie, United lost 2–1 at home to Real Madrid after a red card was handed to United player Nani for going in with his foot at chest height in the 56th minute. Cristiano Ronaldo scored against his former club in both ties.

Date	Round	Opponents	H / A	Result F–A	Scorers	Attendance
13 February 2013	Round of 16; First leg	Real Madrid	A	1–1	Welbeck 20'	85,454
5 March 2013	Round of 16; Second leg	Real Madrid	H	1–2	Ramos 48' (o.g.)	74,959

== Squad statistics ==
No.	Pos.	Name	League		FA Cup		League Cup		Europe		Total		Discipline	
No.	Pos.	Name	Apps	Goals	Apps	Goals	Apps	Goals	Apps	Goals	Apps	Goals	Yellow card	Red card
1	GK	(Spain) David de Gea	28	0	5	0	1	0	7	0	41	0	0	0
2	DF	(Brazil) Rafael	27(1)	3	4	0	1	0	6(1)	0	38(2)	3	8	1
3	DF	(France) Patrice Evra	34	4	3	0	0	0	5	0	42	4	5	0
4	DF	(England) Phil Jones	13(4)	0	4	0	0	0	3	0	20(4)	0	4	0
5	DF	(England) Rio Ferdinand	26(2)	1	2	0	0	0	3(1)	0	31(3)	1	3	0
6	DF	(Northern Ireland) Jonny Evans	21(2)	3	2	0	0	0	5	1	28(2)	4	2	0
7	MF	(Ecuador) Antonio Valencia	24(6)	1	3(3)	0	0	0	2(2)	0	29(11)	1	7	0
8	MF	(Brazil) Anderson	9(8)	1	3	0	2	1	3(1)	0	17(9)	2	1	0
9	FW	(Bulgaria) Dimitar Berbatov	0	0	0	0	0	0	0	0	0	0	0	0
10	FW	(England) Wayne Rooney	22(5)	12	3	3	1	0	5(1)	1	31(6)	16	7	0
11	MF	(Wales) Ryan Giggs	12(10)	2	2(2)	1	1	2	3(2)	0	18(14)	5	1	0
12	DF	(England) Chris Smalling	10(5)	0	5	0	0	0	2	0	17(5)	0	2	0
13	GK	(Denmark) Anders Lindegaard	10	0	1	0	1	0	1	0	13	0	0	0
14	FW	(Mexico) Javier Hernández	9(13)	10	6	4	2	1	5(1)	3	22(14)	18	1	0
15	DF	(Serbia) Nemanja Vidić (c)	18(1)	1	2	0	0	0	2	0	22(1)	1	4	0
16	MF	(England) Michael Carrick	34(2)	1	3(2)	0	0	0	5	1	42(4)	2	4	0
17	MF	(Portugal) Nani	7(4)	1	4(1)	1	1	1	3(1)	0	15(6)	3	1	1
18	MF	(England) Ashley Young	17(2)	0	1(1)	0	0	0	0(2)	0	18(5)	0	1	0
19	FW	(England) Danny Welbeck	13(14)	1	3(1)	0	2	0	5(2)	1	23(17)	2	1	0
20	FW	(Netherlands) Robin van Persie	35(3)	26	0(4)	1	0	0	5(1)	3	40(8)	30	7	0
21	FW	(Chile) Ángelo Henríquez	0	0	0	0	0	0	0	0	0	0	0	0
22	MF	(England) Paul Scholes	8(8)	1	1(2)	0	0	0	1(1)	0	10(11)	1	10	0
23	MF	(England) Tom Cleverley	18(4)	2	4	1	1	1	5	0	28(4)	4	2	0
24	MF	(Scotland) Darren Fletcher	2(1)	1	0	0	2	0	3(2)	0	7(3)	1	0	0
25	MF	(England) Nick Powell	0(2)	1	0	0	0(2)	0	2	0	2(4)	1	0	0
26	MF	(Japan) Shinji Kagawa	17(3)	6	2(1)	0	0	0	3	0	22(4)	6	1	0
27	FW	(Italy) Federico Macheda	0	0	0	0	0(1)	0	0(2)	0	0(3)	0	0	0
28	DF	(Netherlands) Alexander Büttner	4(1)	2	3	0	2	0	3	0	12(1)	2	1	0
31	DF	(England) Scott Wootton	0	0	0	0	2	0	1(1)	0	3(1)	0	1	0
33	FW	(Portugal) Bebé	0	0	0	0	0	0	0	0	0	0	0	0
34	MF	(England) Larnell Cole	0	0	0	0	0	0	0	0	0	0	0	0
35	MF	(England) Jesse Lingard	0	0	0	0	0	0	0	0	0	0	0	0
36	DF	(Belgium) Marnick Vermijl	0	0	0	0	1	0	0	0	1	0	0	0
37	MF	(Republic of Ireland) Robbie Brady	0	0	0	0	0(1)	0	0	0	0(1)	0	0	0
38	DF	(England) Michael Keane	0	0	0	0	2	0	0	0	2	0	1	0
39	DF	(England) Tom Thorpe	0	0	0	0	0	0	0	0	0	0	0	0
40	GK	(England) Ben Amos	0	0	0	0	0	0	0	0	0	0	0	0
41	FW	(Norway) Joshua King	0	0	0	0	0	0	0(1)	0	0(1)	0	0	0
42	DF	(England) Tyler Blackett	0	0	0	0	0	0	0	0	0	0	0	0
44	MF	(Belgium) Adnan Januzaj	0	0	0	0	0	0	0	0	0	0	0	0
45	MF	(Italy) Davide Petrucci	0	0	0	0	0	0	0	0	0	0	0	0
46	MF	(England) Ryan Tunnicliffe	0	0	0	0	0(2)	0	0	0	0(2)	0	0	0
48	FW	(England) Will Keane	0	0	0	0	0	0	0	0	0	0	0	0
49	DF	(Switzerland) Frédéric Veseli	0	0	0	0	0	0	0	0	0	0	0	0
50	GK	(England) Sam Johnstone	0	0	0	0	0	0	0	0	0	0	0	0
Own goals			–	6	–	0	–	0	–	1	–	7	–	–

Statistics accurate as of 19 May 2013

== Transfers ==
=== In ===
Date	Pos.	Name	From	Fee
1 July 2012	MF	(Japan) Shinji Kagawa	(Germany) Borussia Dortmund	Undisclosed
1 July 2012	MF	(England) Nick Powell	(England) Crewe Alexandra	Undisclosed
17 August 2012	FW	(Netherlands) Robin van Persie	(England) Arsenal	Undisclosed
21 August 2012	DF	(Netherlands) Alexander Büttner	(Netherlands) Vitesse	Undisclosed
5 September 2012	FW	(Chile) Ángelo Henríquez	Universidad de Chile	Undisclosed
26 January 2013	FW	(England) Wilfried Zaha	(England) Crystal Palace	Undisclosed

=== Out ===
Date	Pos.	Name	To	Fee
1 July 2012	MF	(Northern Ireland) Oliver Norwood	(England) Huddersfield Town	Undisclosed
1 July 2012	MF	(France) Paul Pogba	(Italy) Juventus	Tribunal
1 July 2012	DF	(England) Zeki Fryers	(Belgium) Standard Liège	Free
1 July 2012	GK	(Poland) Tomasz Kuszczak	Released	
1 July 2012	GK	(Australia) Liam Jacob	Released	
1 July 2012	FW	(England) Michael Owen	Released	
1 July 2012	GK	(Republic of Ireland) Joe Coll	Released	
9 July 2012	MF	(South Korea) Park Ji-sung	(England) Queens Park Rangers	Undisclosed
31 August 2012	FW	(Bulgaria) Dimitar Berbatov	(England) Fulham	Undisclosed
2 January 2013	FW	(Norway) Joshua King	(England) Blackburn Rovers	Undisclosed
8 January 2013	MF	(Republic of Ireland) Robbie Brady	(England) Hull City	Undisclosed
13 May 2013	DF	(Republic of Ireland) Sean McGinty	Released	
19 May 2013	MF	(England) Paul Scholes	Retired	

=== Loan out ===
Date from	Date to	Pos.	Name	To
2 July 2012	30 June 2013	DF	(Brazil) Fábio	(England) Queens Park Rangers
13 July 2012	2 January 2013	FW	(England) John Cofie	(England) Sheffield United
20 July 2012	7 January 2013	DF	(England) Reece Brown	(England) Coventry City
31 July 2012	3 January 2013	GK	(England) Ben Amos	(England) Hull City
4 August 2012	13 September 2012	DF	(Republic of Ireland) Sean McGinty	(England) Oxford United
31 August 2012	30 June 2013	MF	(England) Luke Giverin	(Belgium) Royal Antwerp
31 August 2012	2 January 2013	FW	(Netherlands) Gyliano van Velzen	(Belgium) Royal Antwerp
5 November 2012	2 January 2013	MF	(Republic of Ireland) Robbie Brady	(England) Hull City
6 November 2012	30 June 2013	DF	(England) Michael Keane	(England) Leicester City
6 November 2012	2 January 2013	MF	(England) Jesse Lingard	(England) Leicester City
6 November 2012	5 January 2013	DF	(Republic of Ireland) Sean McGinty	(England) Carlisle United
22 November 2012	31 December 2012	FW	(Norway) Joshua King	(England) Blackburn Rovers
1 January 2013	30 June 2013	FW	(Portugal) Bebé	(Portugal) Rio Ave
2 January 2013	30 June 2013	FW	(Chile) Ángelo Henríquez	(England) Wigan Athletic
9 January 2013	30 June 2013	MF	(Italy) Davide Petrucci	(England) Peterborough United
9 January 2013	30 June 2013	DF	(England) Scott Wootton	(England) Peterborough United
24 January 2013	30 June 2013	FW	(Italy) Federico Macheda	(Germany) VfB Stuttgart
25 January 2013	25 March 2013	DF	(Northern Ireland) Luke McCullough	(England) Cheltenham Town
26 January 2013	30 June 2013	FW	(England) Wilfried Zaha	(England) Crystal Palace
8 February 2013	8 March 2013	FW	(England) John Cofie	(England) Notts County
21 February 2013	21 March 2013	MF	(England) Ryan Tunnicliffe	(England) Barnsley
25 February 2013	30 June 2013	DF	(England) Reece Brown	(England) Ipswich Town
20 March 2013	30 June 2013	GK	(England) Sam Johnstone	(England) Walsall
28 March 2013	30 June 2013	DF	(Republic of Ireland) Sean McGinty	(England) Tranmere Rovers
