= 2009–10 Manchester United F.C. season =

English football club season

Manchester United
2009–10 season
- Co-chairmen: Joel and Avram Glazer
- Manager: Sir Alex Ferguson
- Stadium: Old Trafford
- Premier League: 2nd
- FA Cup: Third round
- Football League Cup: Winners
- UEFA Champions League: Quarter-finals
- FA Community Shield: Runners-up
- Top goalscorer: League: Wayne Rooney (26); All: Wayne Rooney (34)
- Highest home attendance: 75,316 (vs. Stoke City, 9 May)
- Lowest home attendance: 51,160 (vs. Wolverhampton Wanderers, 23 September)
- Average home league attendance: 74,684
Home colours	Away colours	Third colours

The 2009–10 season was Manchester United's 18th season in the Premier League, and their 35th consecutive season in the top division of English football. Having equalled Liverpool's record of 18 English league titles the previous season, Manchester United were looking to break that record with an unprecedented fourth consecutive Premier League title in 2009–10, but they were ultimately beaten to the title by Chelsea by a single point. They also had the chance to be the first team to reach three consecutive Champions League finals since Juventus in 1998, but they were knocked out in the quarter-finals by Bayern Munich.

On 3 January 2010, United were knocked out of the FA Cup in the third round after a surprise 1–0 home defeat to fierce rivals Leeds United, who were in League One. This was their first exit in the competition at this stage since 1984. Despite this, they won the League Cup for the second season in a row, beating Aston Villa 2–1 at Wembley on 28 February. In doing so, they became the first club to successfully defend the trophy since Nottingham Forest in 1990, and the third club to do so overall, after Forest (1989 and 1990) and Liverpool (1981, 1982, 1983 and 1984). Their fourth League Cup title and their third in five years, it was the first time in the club's history that they successfully defended a major cup.

== Pre-season friendlies ==
Manchester United announced the first four fixtures of their 2009 pre-season schedule on 14 January 2009, with the team touring Asia for the seventh time since 1995. The 22-man squad first headed out to Malaysia on 16 July 2009, in time for their first fixture two days later against a Malaysia XI at the Bukit Jalil National Stadium in Bukit Jalil, Kuala Lumpur. United took a 2–0 lead in the first half-hour through Rooney and Nani, but Mohd Amri Yahyah pulled one back on the stroke of half-time before pulling the sides level seven minutes into the second half. Michael Owen then scored his first goal for Manchester United in the 85th minute to win the match for the club. The team was then scheduled to travel to Jakarta, Indonesia four days later, where they would play against an Indonesian Super League Select XI at the Gelora Bung Karno Stadium on 20 July. However, following the bombings on 17 July, the club cancelled the match. Had the match gone ahead, it would have been United's first visit to Indonesia since 1975, and only the second time in history. Instead, the team played a second match against the Malaysia XI at Bukit Jalil on 20 July, which they won 2–0 with goals from Federico Macheda and Michael Owen in the first 15 minutes.

They then flew to South Korea for a match against FC Seoul at the Seoul World Cup Stadium on 24 July. After going into the half-time interval 2–1 down, goals from Federico Macheda and Dimitar Berbatov led United to a 3–2 win. The final match of the tour was played in China on 26 July 2009 against Hangzhou Greentown at the Yellow Dragon Stadium in Hangzhou, Zhejiang. Although it took more than a quarter of the match before the first goal came, they then began to flow thick and fast as Michael Owen scored a brace, Dimitar Berbatov, Zoran Tošić and Nani got one each, and Ryan Giggs scored a hat-trick from the bench to secure an 8–2 win.

En route from returning from East Asia, the United team travelled to Munich to take part in the Audi Cup on 29 and 30 July 2009. The tournament, organised to celebrate Audi's 100th year in business, featured the hosts Bayern Munich, as well as Milan and Boca Juniors. Four matches were played at the Allianz Arena in Munich over two days, with United first playing against Boca Juniors. With a 2–1 win featuring a maiden goal for Anderson and a debut goal for Antonio Valencia, United secured a place in the final against Bayern Munich the next day. Both sides played out a cagey goalless draw, meaning that the match went straight to penalties. The score reached 6–6 after seven penalties each before Jonny Evans saw his kick saved by Michael Rensing, allowing Daniel Van Buyten to seal the win for the host team. After returning to England, United played their final friendly of the summer at Old Trafford against Valencia on 5 August 2009. Second half goals from Wayne Rooney and Tom Cleverley secured a 2–0 win.

Date	Opponents	H / A	Result F–A	Scorers	Attendance
18 July 2009	Malaysia XI	N	3–2	Rooney 8', Nani 28', Owen 85'	85,000
20 July 2009	Malaysia XI	N	2–0	Macheda 11', Owen 13'	30,000
24 July 2009	FC Seoul	A	3–2	Rooney 31', Macheda 58', Berbatov 65'	64,000
26 July 2009	Hangzhou Greentown	A	8–2	Owen (2) 23', 39', Berbatov 30', Tošić 32', Nani 50', Giggs (3) 71', 81', 88'	30,000
29 July 2009	Boca Juniors	N	2–1	Anderson 23', Valencia 42'	61,000
30 July 2009	Bayern Munich	A	0–0 (6–7p)		69,000
5 August 2009	Valencia	H	2–0	Rooney 52', Cleverley 73'	74,311

== FA Community Shield ==
As 2008–09 Premier League champions, United kicked off the 2009–10 season with the traditional annual curtain-raiser, the 2009 FA Community Shield, on 9 August 2009, when they played against 2008–09 FA Cup winners Chelsea. Portuguese international Nani opened the scoring for United in the 10th minute, but Chelsea equalised through his compatriot Ricardo Carvalho seven minutes into the second half. Chelsea then took the lead through a controversial Frank Lampard goal in the 70th minute; with Manchester United in possession, Michael Ballack body-checked Patrice Evra only for the referee to play advantage. With Evra still on the floor, possession then changed leaving United short-handed in defence, allowing Lampard to shoot past Ben Foster in the United goal. With Chelsea leading as the match went into injury time, Ryan Giggs played in Wayne Rooney, who lifted the ball over the onrushing Petr Čech to take the match to penalties. Lampard opened the scoring in the shootout, only for Ryan Giggs to have his kick down the middle of the goal saved by the feet of Čech. Ballack, Carrick and Drogba all converted before Evra's tame effort was held by Čech. That left Salomon Kalou with the opportunity to win the game for Chelsea, which he took with aplomb, smashing the ball into the top corner of the goal. If Manchester United had won, it would have made them the first team to win the FA Community Shield outright three times in a row.

Date	Opponents	H / A	Result F–A	Scorers	Attendance
9 August 2009	Chelsea	N	2–2 (1–4p)	Nani 10', Rooney 90+2'	85,896

== Premier League ==
The 2009–10 Premier League fixtures were released on 17 June 2009, with Manchester United opening their campaign against Championship runners-up Birmingham City on 16 August 2009. Despite missing several of their first-choice defenders and goalkeeper Edwin van der Sar, United won the match 1–0 with a first-half goal from Wayne Rooney. The goal came in the 34th minute, when Dimitar Berbatov released Nani down the left. The Portuguese international then crossed for Rooney, whose header ricocheted back off the post to him, allowing him to tap in with Hart beaten.

Three days later, the Red Devils suffered their first defeat of the season, going down by a single goal at Burnley. United went behind after 19 minutes as Robbie Blake hit a volley into the top corner of the net after Stephen Jordan's cross was only half-cleared by Patrice Evra. Blake himself conceded a penalty on the stroke of half-time, but Michael Carrick had his kick saved by Brian Jensen, low to the goalkeeper's right. As the Reds – wearing their all-black change strip – searched for an equaliser, the final ball kept evading them and several moves came to nothing, leaving United to endure a defeat by the newly promoted club.

After the mid-week setback, United returned to winning ways at the weekend, beating Wigan Athletic 5–0 at the DW Stadium on 22 August. Despite a goalless first half, Wayne Rooney scored his 100th and 101st goals for Manchester United, either side of one from Dimitar Berbatov. Michael Owen scored his first competitive goal for the club five minutes from full-time, before Nani made it five with a free-kick in the second minute of injury time.

United faced their first "big four" opposition of the season on 29 August, when they hosted Arsenal at Old Trafford. Arsenal opened the scoring five minutes from the end of the first half through Andrey Arshavin; the Russian playmaker had been denied a penalty claim moments earlier, but then picked the ball up from Denílson just outside the penalty area and fired a 25-yard strike past Ben Foster. Wayne Rooney won a penalty for Manchester United in the 59th minute, knocking Ryan Giggs' through-ball past Manuel Almunia, who brought the English striker down. Rooney then stepped up to take the penalty himself, and slotted it home to the 'keeper's left. Arsenal responded with a free-kick from Robin van Persie that hit the crossbar, but a United attack immediately afterwards produced a similar free kick, taken by Ryan Giggs, which Abou Diaby headed into his own net. With the final attack of the game, deep into the fifth minute of injury time, Arsenal had the ball in the net again, only for the goal to be ruled out for offside against William Gallas, and the match finished 2–1 to United. For his show of frustration with the offside decision – kicking a water bottle down the touchline – Arsène Wenger was sent off.

After a two-week break for internationals, United returned to Premier League action with an away match against Tottenham Hotspur. Despite United having their first-choice centre-back partnership together for the first time since the 2009 UEFA Champions League Final, Spurs took the lead after 38 seconds through a Jermain Defoe bicycle kick. Ryan Giggs levelled the scores in the 25th minute, curling a free kick past Carlo Cudicini in the Tottenham goal, before Anderson gave United the lead with his first competitive goal for the club. In the space of 10 minutes in the second half, Paul Scholes received two yellow cards and was sent off, although the second booking was controversial and later criticised by manager Alex Ferguson. Nevertheless, despite being reduced to ten men, the Red Devils increased their lead to 3–1 as Wayne Rooney slotted the ball through Cudicini's legs for the final goal of the game – Rooney's fifth in five league matches. The result took United to second place in the league table, behind unbeaten Chelsea and ahead of Manchester City, who had a game in hand. Giggs' goal continued his record of having scored a League goal in every Premier League season since the Premier League began in 1992–93, the only player to have done so.

Five days after playing against Beşiktaş in Turkey, United returned to England for a home match against local rivals Manchester City, the first Manchester derby of the season. Despite having only just recovered from a knee injury, Carlos Tevez was picked to start against his former team by City manager Mark Hughes (himself a former Manchester United striker). United drew first blood, as Wayne Rooney, in the second minute, scored his sixth goal in as many league games, but Gareth Barry equalised for City less than 15 minutes later after Tevez had forced an error from Ben Foster in the United goal. The score remained at 1–1 going into half-time, but no sooner than Darren Fletcher had restored United's lead, heading in a Ryan Giggs cross four minutes after the break, Craig Bellamy drew City level again as Park Ji-sung was drawn away by the run of Tevez. After Berbatov had twice been denied by saves from Shay Given, the Bulgarian striker was withdrawn for Michael Owen with 13 minutes left to play. Giggs again provided a cross for Fletcher to head United 3–2 up three minutes later, but with 10 seconds of normal time left to play, Martin Petrov was gifted possession by Rio Ferdinand and played Bellamy in, who scored past the onrushing Foster. The fourth official had already indicated that a minimum of four minutes would be added onto the 90 to account for stoppages, but Bellamy's goal celebration and United's substitution of Carrick for Anderson meant that more would have to be played. Then, in the sixth minute of added time, Giggs played a through-ball for Owen, who clipped the ball over Shay Given to clinch a last-gasp 4–3 win that temporarily sent the home side to the top of the table. Mark Hughes later expressed his aggravation at the fact that United's winning goal had come almost 90 seconds after the added time indicated by the fourth official had elapsed, and television analysis also showed that the referee should have signalled the end of the game one second before Owen's goal had crossed the line.

The following weekend, United made the trip to Stoke-on-Trent to take on Stoke City at the Britannia Stadium. After a goalless first half, Ryan Giggs was brought on in place of Nani ten minutes into the second half, and had an almost-immediate impact. Darren Fletcher played a through-ball into the penalty area and into the path of Giggs, who then played a square ball across the edge of the six-yard box to Dimitar Berbatov, allowing the Bulgarian a simple finish. With 15 minutes left to play, Fletcher was bundled over by Rory Delap on the right side of the penalty area. The left-footed Giggs crossed the consequent free-kick into the penalty area, where John O'Shea rose above his marker, Danny Collins, to head the ball past Thomas Sørensen in the Stoke goal. The match finished at 2–0 and, combined with Chelsea's 3–1 defeat by Wigan Athletic the same day, the result meant that United finished the weekend on top of the league for the first time in the season.

The league schedule took United back to Old Trafford for their next game against Sunderland on 3 October. United were one of four teams still protecting a 100% home record in 2009–10, but it was Sunderland who took the lead after seven minutes, as Darren Bent beat Ben Foster from outside the penalty area. It took United until five minutes into the second half to equalise: Dimitar Berbatov volleying John O'Shea's cross home with a bicycle kick. However, parity was short-lived as Kenwyne Jones scored for the Black Cats just seven minutes later. The Sunderland striker went up for a header with Foster, but the two collided and the ball came off the Trinidadian and trickled into the empty net. With six minutes remaining in normal time, Sunderland's former Manchester United winger Kieran Richardson was sent off for dissent, leading to a second yellow card. This allowed pressure from Manchester United to mount, and in the fourth minute of injury time, a shot across the face of goal from Patrice Evra was turned into the Sunderland goal by defender Anton Ferdinand – brother of United defender Rio. The 2–2 result maintained United's unbeaten home record for the season and gave them a one-point lead at the top of the table. However, they dropped to second place after Chelsea beat Liverpool the following day.

Another international break followed in the middle of October, from which Wayne Rooney returned with a calf strain, ruling him out of United's next fixture against Bolton Wanderers on 17 October. However, Edwin van der Sar recovered from his hand injury to make his first appearance of the season, while Berbatov returned from the birth of his first child in Bulgaria to partner Michael Owen up front. A header from Owen, diverted into the net by Zat Knight, gave United the lead in the fifth minute, before Antonio Valencia doubled the lead just after the half-hour mark. The Ecuadorian winger played a one-two with Gary Neville to work his way into the penalty area, and then fired the ball past Jussi Jääskeläinen. Matthew Taylor pulled a goal back for Bolton, heading home a cross from Kevin Davies, but it turned out to be the last goal of the game, and United won 2–1. Following Chelsea's 2–1 defeat by Aston Villa earlier in the day, United's win sent them back to the top of the league table.

After returning from a trip to Moscow in the Champions League in mid-week, United travelled down the M62 to take on Liverpool in the first North West derby of the season on 25 October. In the build-up to the game, much media attention had been spent on the fitness of Wayne Rooney, who had missed the club's last two games, and the prospect of Michael Owen facing his former club in Manchester United colours for the first time. Rooney was passed fit on the morning of the game, meaning that Owen started on the bench, while Giggs and Evra also started after missing the match against CSKA Moscow. Liverpool and their manager Rafael Benítez went into the game under great pressure, having lost their previous four games and on the verge of their worst losing streak in 56 years. Liverpool had also been struggling with injuries, with Steven Gerrard, Glen Johnson and Fernando Torres all doubtful for the starting line-up. Gerrard was eventually deemed not fit to play, but Johnson and Torres both started, and it was the Spanish striker who opened the scoring in the 65th minute. Yossi Benayoun, in the side as Gerrard's deputy, played a through-ball to Torres, who outpaced Nemanja Vidić before shrugging off the challenge of Rio Ferdinand and shooting past Van der Sar from a narrowing angle. A few minutes later, Michael Owen was brought on in place of Dimitar Berbatov to a chorus of boos from the Anfield crowd, but the former Liverpool man was unable to turn the game in United's favour. He did manage to draw a foul by Jamie Carragher on the edge of the Liverpool penalty area, for which Carragher received a yellow card, although there were suggestions that the Liverpool captain was the last man and should have been sent off. Vidić was booked for an unnecessary foul on Torres in the 75th minute, and then committed a cynical foul on Dirk Kuyt in the 90th, resulting in his third red card in as many matches against Liverpool. Deep into injury time, Javier Mascherano was also sent off for a second bookable offence – a rash tackle on Edwin van der Sar – but it was Liverpool who had the last word as David Ngog sealed a 2–0 win with a goal in the sixth minute of injury time. Following Chelsea's win over Blackburn Rovers the day before, the result meant that United dropped to second place in the Premier League.

Injuries to Rio Ferdinand and Nemanja Vidić kept them out of United's next league match against Blackburn Rovers on 31 October, meaning that Jonny Evans and Wes Brown would continue their defensive partnership from the League Cup game against Barnsley in mid-week. Dimitar Berbatov found the back of the net in the first half, set up by a square pass from Wayne Rooney, but the goal was ruled out as Rooney was found to have been offside when Nani played him the ball in the build-up. The first legitimate goal of the game came 10 minutes into the second half: Patrice Evra hit a shot from well outside the area, but it was going well wide; Berbatov controlled the ball with one touch before swivelling and shooting into the bottom corner of Paul Robinson's goal. Rooney secured a 2–0 win for United three minutes from the end of normal time, following some neat wing play by Gabriel Obertan – making his Premier League debut – and Anderson. The French winger made his way down the touchline before allowing the Brazilian to take over; Anderson hit a left-footed cross into the area, which Rooney met with a first-time shot. A win for Arsenal in the North London derby earlier in the day had pushed United down to third place in the Premier League table, but the victory over Blackburn returned the Red Devils to second place by the end of the day.

United then went to Stamford Bridge to play Chelsea. Despite having good levels of possession and playing well, United ultimately suffered a 1–0 defeat, following a John Terry goal fifteen minutes from time, which dropped them to third in the table.

Following the loss to Chelsea, United welcomed Everton to Old Trafford on 21 November. With Berbatov out injured, this gave Michael Owen a spot in the starting 11. Tomasz Kuszczak also started ahead of Ben Foster due to Van der Sar's injury. United had early chances but found it very difficult to put the ball in the back of the net. Everton created few chances and were saved by Leighton Baines and Joseph Yobo in the first 20 minutes as the Toffees held on. United turned possession into goals in the 35th minute when Evra's cross was laid off by the head of Antonio Valencia to Darren Fletcher, who emphatically drilled home a spectacular half-volley past the outstretched and former Red Tim Howard in goal for the Merseysiders. Michael Owen had a half chance to extend the lead for United shortly before half time when he timed his run perfectly to stay onside and latch onto Wayne Rooney's skilful flick. However, he would have done well to score from the tight angle as Howard quickly rushed out to block his shot. Carrick doubled the champions' lead with a low left-foot drive; Giggs' cross found a way back to him after a poor shot from Rooney and took a few touches before he picked out an unmarked Carrick at the edge of the box. Valencia made it 3–0 eight minutes later with a deflected shot off Baines that wrong-footed Howard. Scholes laid it off to him as the Ecuadorian made no mistake in wrapping up a comprehensive victory.

Still without their usual back four, the Red Devils then travelled south to a drenched Fratton Park to play rock-bottom Portsmouth. Both Berbatov and Owen were left on the bench, meaning that Giggs and Rooney would start up front together for the first time in the season. Ben Foster's status as Manchester United's third-choice goalkeeper was also underlined as Kuszczak was selected in place of the injured Edwin van der Sar. The Pole was quickly called into action as Portsmouth began brightly, denying Aruna Dindane before an excellent acrobatic save to deny Jamie O'Hara. It took nearly half an hour before United had found the net. Rooney won a penalty after he was fouled by Michael Brown inside the penalty area; he himself stepped up to slot the resulting penalty home despite Asmir Begović tipping the curling ball. Parity was short-lived as Kevin-Prince Boateng equalised for the hosts just eight minutes later via another penalty goal after Serbian international Nemanja Vidić clumsily fouled Frédéric Piquionne. Nevertheless, United put on a master-class during the second half, Wayne Rooney scoring his first hat-trick of the season with another penalty and a superb tap-in. Three minutes from time, Giggs bagged his 100th Premier League goal with a curling free kick on the eve of his 36th birthday.

Three days after a shock 1–0 home defeat by Aston Villa, United were visited by Wolverhampton Wanderers on 15 December. Wolves lasted 30 minutes before falling behind to a Wayne Rooney penalty which was awarded after Ronald Zubar handled Darron Gibson's corner kick. Two minutes before the interval, Nemanja Vidić – skipper for the day – headed United to a 2–0 lead despite Marcus Hahnemann making his best effort to stop the ball crossing the line. In the 66th minute, Antonio Valencia once again wrapped up another 3–0 victory, curling his effort from 16 yards into the top right-hand corner after neat play from Dimitar Berbatov.

United suffered their fifth loss of the season on 19 December, losing 3–0 to Fulham at Craven Cottage. This was their heaviest away league defeat for over three-and-a-half years, when Chelsea clinched the 2005–06 title by beating United by the same scoreline at Stamford Bridge on 29 April 2006.

United followed this with a visit to the KC Stadium to play Hull City, a game that they won 3–1 following goals from Wayne Rooney and Dimitar Berbatov either side of an own goal from Andy Dawson. This result lifted them back into second place.

United ended 2009 in the league with their second 5–0 thrashing of Wigan of the season, with the goals scored by five different players. Wayne Rooney continued his fine run of form with the opening goal just before the half-hour mark, before Michael Carrick and Rafael scored before half-time. Five minutes into the second half Dimitar Berbatov scored and the rout was completed by Antonio Valencia with 15 minutes to go. The result helped United's goal difference column, but they remained second in the table behind Chelsea as the 2010 New Year came around.

Following the unexpected defeat by Leeds United in the third round of the FA Cup, United tried to return to winning ways away at Birmingham. However, United – despite playing well – went behind and only equalised just after an hour through an own goal by Scott Dann. Both teams tried to win the match, but despite late chances for both sides the game ended 1–1 in a match that could have seen United go top had they won.

United returned to winning ways in the league with an ultimately comfortable 3–0 win at home to Burnley. Burnley held out well until just after the hour mark before Dimitar Berbatov opened the scoring from close range. Five minutes later, Wayne Rooney slotted home the second before Mame Biram Diouf scored his first United goal in injury time.

United took full advantage of playing their home game against Hull before Chelsea played to go top of the table (albeit having played two more games than their rivals), but for a long time the issue was in doubt. After Wayne Rooney scored after just eight minutes both teams missed a plethora of chances to score. Rio Ferdinand was very fortunate to avoid a red card and a penalty following an off-the-ball incident (for which he would later be retrospectively suspended for three games, increased to four after his appeal was turned down for being "frivolous"). With just eight minutes of normal time remaining, Rooney's early goal was still the only thing separating the two teams, but then three goals in quick succession – all from Wayne Rooney – gave United a 4–0 win. It was the first time that Rooney had scored four goals in a professional game and put United into first place until both Chelsea won one of two games in hand to drop them down to second again.

United celebrated victory in the League Cup semi-final over local rivals Manchester City with a great performance away at third-placed Arsenal. The Gunners began the match just a point behind United and with hopes of mounting a serious title challenge to United and Chelsea. They began well, Andrey Arshavin shooting wide twice early on when well placed. But a man-of-the-match performance from Portuguese mis-fit Nani turned the match in United's favour. Firstly, a piece of skill took him past two defenders, before he put in a cross towards the far post, which goalkeeper Manuel Almunia palmed into his own net just after the half-hour. Five minutes later, Arsenal had a corner, but a lightning breakaway by Nani and Wayne Rooney saw the latter score his 100th Premier League goal by slotting past Almunia with a first-time shot from a great pass by the Portuguese winger just 11 seconds after Arsenal took their corner. United's attacking on the break continued to cause Arsenal trouble and five minutes into the second half Park Ji-sung broke away from within his own half and, despite having Rooney and Nani in support, slotted past Almunia to seal the three points. A late goal from Thomas Vermaelen (deflected off Jonny Evans gave Arsenal hope, but they failed to find another goal and – after missed chances from Nani and Rooney, the game ended 3–1, leaving United second, one point behind Chelsea having played a game more. Chelsea then failed to beat Hull to leave the top three having all played 24 games, Chelsea two points ahead of United with Arsenal a further four points behind.

United returned (briefly) to the top of the table following a 5–0 thrashing of bottom club Portsmouth at home. Despite a couple of early opportunities for the visitors, including a Jonny Evans clearance off the line, United took the lead five minutes before half-time when Wayne Rooney headed home a Darren Fletcher cross. United were two up before half-time when Nani's cross was turned into his own net by Anthony Vanden Borre, the shot rolling past keeper David James. In the second-half, a Michael Carrick shot took a wild deflection off Richard Hughes to loop over keeper James and in off the crossbar before Dimitar Berbatov made up for a close-range miss in the first-half by shooting home from just outside the penalty area. Portsmouth's misery was complete with more than 20 minutes left when Marc Wilson shot spectacularly into the roof of his own net whilst trying to clear the ball. The win put United top for 24 hours, before Chelsea beat Arsenal to regain the top spot.

United then travelled to Villa Park where they drew 1–1 with Aston Villa. Villa took the lead through a Carlos Cuéllar header but their lead was short-lived as James Collins put through his own net to make the score 1–1. Nani was sent off on 29 minutes for a two-footed tackle on Stiliyan Petrov but United held out for the point, which – combined with Everton's win over Chelsea that evening – reduced the gap at the top of the table to a single point.

United's next game was at Goodison Park against Everton who had beaten Chelsea the previous week. United fared no better, ultimately losing 3–1, despite going in front through a Dimitar Berbatov goal after 16 minutes. However a Diniyar Bilyaletdinov goal three minutes later, followed by second-half goals from Dan Gosling and Jack Rodwell gave United their sixth Premier League defeat of the season. A win would have returned United to the top of the table, since they played before Chelsea, but this defeat, coupled with Chelsea's victory over Wolverhampton Wanderers later in the day increased the gap at the top to four points.

Due to League Cup commitments, United had an early midweek fixture against West Ham United. The game saw the return of Ben Foster in goal but no change in goalscoring service as Wayne Rooney scored two headers and Michael Owen's first league goal since the Manchester derby saw United cruise to a 3–0 win.

United then went to Wolverhampton Wanderers where a tight, poor game was decided by a Paul Scholes goal around ten minutes from time.

United then played at home to Fulham where they exacted direct revenge for the 3–0 defeat at Craven Cottage earlier in the season after two goals from Wayne Rooney, from crosses by Nani and Berbatov and a late third from Dimitar Berbatov himself gave United a win as comfortable as the scoreline suggested.

United's next league game was at home against bitter rivals, Liverpool. The Merseyside team had won the last three games between the two sides, including the 2–0 win at Anfield earlier in the season. It looked like a fourth straight league win might be on the cards when Fernando Torres scored after just four minutes from a Dirk Kuyt cross. However, the lead lasted only a few minutes before Javier Mascherano pulled down Antonio Valencia. The challenge began outside the penalty area, but – on the advice of his assistant referee – official Howard Webb gave a penalty. Pepe Reina saved the kick from Wayne Rooney, but could only parry the ball back to the United forward who buried the rebound. The game remained at 1–1 until the hour mark when Park Ji-sung scored a close-range diving header from a Darren Fletcher cross. Torres and Yossi Benayoun had late chances to steal a draw, but United held on for the win. Chelsea's draw with Blackburn later that day left United two points clear of Arsenal and four ahead of Chelsea, who had played a game less than both the Gunners and United. Chelsea ultimately won their game in hand to go second in the table, a point behind United.

United then went to the Reebok Stadium to face Bolton Wanderers. The game was fairly tight in the first half until a Jlloyd Samuel own goal put United 1–0 up after around half an hour. Saves from Edwin van der Sar kept United in front before 3 goals in twelve minutes in the second half, two from Dimitar Berbatov and one from Darron Gibson gave United a 4–0 win to stay top of the table. In the title race, Chelsea demolished Aston Villa, but Arsenal could only draw away at Birmingham City and dropped 4 points behind United in third place.

However, the top two swapped places after Chelsea defeated United 2–1 at Old Trafford in the next League game. Wayne Rooney was unable to play, having been injured at the end of the Champions League quarter-final first leg defeat by Bayern Munich and United clearly missed their main striker with a below-par performance. Joe Cole slipped a back-heel home midway through the first half and – despite a vastly improved performance in the second, Didier Drogba scored from an offside position after 79 minutes, the goal standing despite the offside. Federico Macheda scored from close range two minutes later (though this goal was also questionable, having appeared to be scored by Macheda's hands) and, although United threw themselves forward (even Edwin van der Sar ran upfield at a late corner) Chelsea held on to take control of the title race with just five games remaining.

Uniteds' next game was away to Blackburn Rovers and followed the 3–2 victory over Bayern Munich in the Champions League, but which was not good enough to put the Reds into the semi-finals of that competition. Having suffered a miserable few days (including the first-leg defeat at Bayern and the previous League defeat by Chelsea), United were looking to bounce back against a team that had not lost a home game since the previous August. Wayne Rooney was out injured and so Federico Macheda was up front with Dimitar Berbatov. Although United pressed hard and played the better football, they could not find their way past a resolute Blackburn defence and the game ended 0–0.

United then went to the City of Manchester Stadium to face Manchester City in the fourth Manchester derby of the season. United needed to win to have any chance of the title, whilst City wanted to win to prevent United having any title aspirations and to boost their own hopes of being in the UEFA Champions League the following season. The game itself had few real chances. Carlos Tevez had a first-half free-kick well saved by Edwin van der Sar, whilst Wayne Rooney (passed fit for the game), Ryan Giggs, Darren Fletcher and Paul Scholes all passed up chances for United. Rooney made way for Dimitar Berbatov with 15 minutes to go. As the game entered added time, Patrick Vieira caused a scramble in the United penalty area, but the ball was eventually cleared. However, it looked as though the game would end goal-less until just 17 seconds from the scheduled end of injury time, Scholes headed in a cross from Patrice Evra to win the match for United. This, coupled with a 2–1 win for Tottenham Hotspur over Chelsea left United just 1 point off the top of the table with 3 games remaining.

Tottenham Hotspur were the next visitors to Old Trafford in a game both teams wanted to win – United to put pressure on Chelsea and Spurs to cement their fourth spot in the League. However, the first half was abysmal, and it was almost 30 minutes before either team had a shot on goal – let alone on target. At the start of the second half, Patrice Evra began vomiting on the pitch, but ultimately stayed on and won a penalty just before the hour mark, which Ryan Giggs scored (Wayne Rooney had picked up a groin injury in training and was ruled out of the match). Ledley King scored with twenty minutes to go to restore parity, but United went back in front ten minutes later after Nani lobbed Heurelho Gomes. Nani was then fouled in the box, giving Giggs his second penalty, which he also scored to give United a 3–1 lead. Nani also began to vomit as injury time came around, but United held on to go back to the top of the table for 24 hours, before Chelsea hammered Stoke City 7–0 to return to the summit.

By the time United played their penultimate game of the season – away to Sunderland – Chelsea had already won their penultimate game away to Liverpool and gone 4 points clear at the top of the table. With Chelsea having a vastly superior goal difference to United, this meant that the Reds had to beat Sunderland to take the title to the final game of the season. A single Nani goal after around half an hour was enough to give United the three points to put them back within a point of Chelsea at the top, with both teams having just one game to play – United at home to Stoke and Chelsea at home to Wigan.

United beat Stoke by a score of 4 goals to nil in the final game of the season. It took almost half an hour to break the Stoke defence down, before a rebound came to Darren Fletcher who shot home. Less than ten minutes later it was 2–0, Ryan Giggs shooting under the Stoke goalkeeper. Further goals in the second half – an own goal from former United player Danny Higginbotham and a late header from Park Ji-sung gave United a comfortable win, but one that was ultimately in vain as Chelsea hammered Wigan 8–0 to win the title.

Date	Opponents	H / A	Result F–A	Scorers	Attendance	League position
16 August 2009	Birmingham City	H	1–0	Rooney 34'	75,062	9th
19 August 2009	Burnley	A	0–1		20,872	10th
22 August 2009	Wigan Athletic	A	5–0	Rooney (2) 56', 65', Berbatov 58', Owen 85', Nani 90+2'	18,164	3rd
29 August 2009	Arsenal	H	2–1	Rooney 59' (pen.), Diaby 64' (o.g.)	75,095	3rd
12 September 2009	Tottenham Hotspur	A	3–1	Giggs 25', Anderson 41', Rooney 78'	35,785	2nd
20 September 2009	Manchester City	H	4–3	Rooney 2', Fletcher (2) 49', 80', Owen 90+6'	75,066	2nd
26 September 2009	Stoke City	A	2–0	Berbatov 62', O'Shea 77'	27,500	1st
3 October 2009	Sunderland	H	2–2	Berbatov 51', Ferdinand 90+4' (o.g.)	75,114	1st
17 October 2009	Bolton Wanderers	H	2–1	Knight 5' (o.g.), Valencia 33'	75,103	1st
25 October 2009	Liverpool	A	0–2		44,188	2nd
31 October 2009	Blackburn Rovers	H	2–0	Berbatov 55', Rooney 87'	74,658	2nd
8 November 2009	Chelsea	A	0–1		41,836	3rd
21 November 2009	Everton	H	3–0	Fletcher 35', Carrick 67', Valencia 76'	75,169	2nd
28 November 2009	Portsmouth	A	4–1	Rooney (3) 25' (pen.), 48', 54' (pen.), Giggs 87'	20,482	2nd
5 December 2009	West Ham United	A	4–0	Scholes 45+1', Gibson 61', Valencia 71', Rooney 72'	34,980	2nd
12 December 2009	Aston Villa	H	0–1		75,130	2nd
15 December 2009	Wolverhampton Wanderers	H	3–0	Rooney 30' (pen.), Vidić 43', Valencia 66'	73,709	2nd
19 December 2009	Fulham	A	0–3		25,700	2nd
27 December 2009	Hull City	A	3–1	Rooney 45+2', Dawson 73' (o.g.), Berbatov 82'	24,627	2nd
30 December 2009	Wigan Athletic	H	5–0	Rooney 28', Carrick 32', Rafael 45', Berbatov 50', Valencia 75'	74,560	2nd
9 January 2010	Birmingham City	A	1–1	Dann 63' (o.g.)	28,907	2nd
16 January 2010	Burnley	H	3–0	Berbatov 64', Rooney 69', Diouf 90+1'	75,120	2nd
23 January 2010	Hull City	H	4–0	Rooney (4) 8', 82', 86', 90+3'	73,933	1st
31 January 2010	Arsenal	A	3–1	Almunia 33' (o.g.), Rooney 37', Park 52'	60,091	2nd
6 February 2010	Portsmouth	H	5–0	Rooney 40', Vanden Borre 45' (o.g.), Carrick 59', Berbatov 62', Wilson 69' (o.g.)	74,684	1st
10 February 2010	Aston Villa	A	1–1	Collins 23' (o.g.)	42,788	2nd
20 February 2010	Everton	A	1–3	Berbatov 16'	39,448	2nd
23 February 2010	West Ham United	H	3–0	Rooney (2) 38', 55', Owen 80'	73,797	2nd
6 March 2010	Wolverhampton Wanderers	A	1–0	Scholes 73'	28,883	1st
14 March 2010	Fulham	H	3–0	Rooney (2) 46', 84', Berbatov 89'	75,207	1st
21 March 2010	Liverpool	H	2–1	Rooney 12', Park 60'	75,216	1st
27 March 2010	Bolton Wanderers	A	4–0	Samuel 38' (o.g.), Berbatov (2) 69', 78', Gibson 82'	25,370	1st
3 April 2010	Chelsea	H	1–2	Macheda 81'	75,217	2nd
11 April 2010	Blackburn Rovers	A	0–0		29,912	2nd
17 April 2010	Manchester City	A	1–0	Scholes 90+3'	47,019	2nd
24 April 2010	Tottenham Hotspur	H	3–1	Giggs (2) 58' (pen.), 86' (pen.), Nani 81'	75,268	1st
2 May 2010	Sunderland	A	1–0	Nani 28'	47,641	2nd
9 May 2010	Stoke City	H	4–0	Fletcher 31', Giggs 38', Higginbotham 54' (o.g.), Park 84'	75,316	2nd

Pos	Team	Pld	W	D	L	GF	GA	GD	Pts	Qualification or relegation
1	Chelsea (C)	38	27	5	6	103	32	+71	86	Qualification for the Champions League group stage
2	Manchester United	38	27	4	7	86	28	+58	85	Qualification for the Champions League group stage
3	Arsenal	38	23	6	9	83	41	+42	75	Qualification for the Champions League group stage
4	Tottenham Hotspur	38	21	7	10	67	41	+26	70	Qualification for the Champions League play-off round
5	Manchester City	38	18	13	7	73	45	+28	67	Qualification for the Europa League play-off round (Note: Since Manchester United won the League Cup and then qualified for the Champions League, their spot in the Europa League was passed down to the 6th-placed team. The 6th-placed Aston Villa was coincidentally also the League Cup runners-up.)

Source: Barclays Premier League
(C) Champions

== FA Cup ==
Manchester United entered the FA Cup at the Third Round, and were the last home team drawn on 29 November 2009. They welcomed rivals Leeds United to Old Trafford on 3 January 2010. Leeds reached the Third Round after beating Kettering Town 5–1 after extra time in a replay of their Second Round tie.

With a League Cup semi-final against Manchester City three days later in mind, Alex Ferguson opted for a mix of youth and experience for the Leeds match; the midfield quartet of Gabriel Obertan, Darron Gibson, Anderson and Danny Welbeck had an average age of almost 21, while Gary Neville and Wes Brown started in defence with Wayne Rooney and Dimitar Berbatov up front. United went into the game 43 places above their opponents in the league system and started on the front foot; however, it was Leeds who opened the scoring in the 19th minute, when a long ball forward found Jermaine Beckford, who held off Wes Brown before poking the ball past Tomasz Kuszczak in the United goal. In search of an equaliser, Manchester United had two penalty appeals turned down in the second half and both Rooney and Michael Owen missed the target from close range, but the goal never came and the match finished 1–0 to Leeds, their first win at Old Trafford since 1981. The result meant that United had been eliminated from the FA Cup at the third round stage for the first time under the management of Alex Ferguson – they last lost an FA Cup third round tie in 1984, when they were beaten 2–0 by Bournemouth at Dean Court.

Date	Round	Opponents	H / A	Result F–A	Scorers	Attendance
3 January 2010	Round 3	Leeds United	H	0–1		74,526

== League Cup ==
As one of the seven Premier League sides involved in European competition in the 2009–10 season, Manchester United received a bye to the Third Round of the League Cup. The draw for the Third Round took place on 29 August 2009, and gave Manchester United a home tie against fellow Premier League side Wolverhampton Wanderers. The match was played at Old Trafford on 23 September 2009, and Alex Ferguson took the opportunity to give playing time to some of the club's fringe players, including back-up goalkeeper Tomasz Kuszczak, midfielder Darron Gibson and forwards Danny Welbeck and Federico Macheda, while derby hero Michael Owen was also given a position in the starting line-up. Ferguson also handed squad numbers to young Norwegian duo Joshua King and Magnus Eikrem. However, United were reduced to 10 men half-an-hour into the match as Fabio was sent off for a professional foul on Michael Kightly, who was through on goal; Ferguson responded by bringing Ritchie De Laet on in place of Macheda. Despite the numerical disadvantage, though, United went one-up in the 66th minute, as Welbeck played a one-two with Owen before firing past Wolves' goalkeeper Marcus Hahnemann. With ten minutes left in the game, Ferguson gave Joshua King his professional debut, coming on in place of Welbeck. Although King had two opportunities to add to United's lead, the match finished at 1–0 and Manchester United progressed to the Fourth Round of the competition.

The draw for the Fourth Round was made on 26 September 2009, and handed Manchester United a trip to Oakwell to play against Barnsley, who are managed by former United striker Mark Robins. The match was played on 27 October 2009, and the lower-league opposition meant that Ferguson could afford to pick some of the less experienced members of his squad, while summer signing Gabriel Obertan was given his first senior start for the club. Danny Welbeck opened the scoring for United in the sixth minute, heading home Anderson's corner for the only goal of the first half. Michael Owen doubled United's lead with a coolly taken finish 14 minutes into the second half, shooting early past former Manchester United goalkeeper Luke Steele from just inside the penalty area after playing the ball through the defender's legs. Despite a controversial red card for Gary Neville – given more for his follow-through than the actual tackle on Adam Hammill – United held on for a 2–0 win that sent them into the last eight of the competition.

In the draw for the Fifth Round of the competition, held on 31 October 2009, United were given a home tie against Tottenham Hotspur, in a repeat of the 2009 final. The match was played on 1 December 2009. United won 2–0 after a brace from Darron Gibson in the first half. He drove his first goal low into the left side of the net after a pass from Anderson. His second goal came after he hit the ball first time after it becoming loose just outside the box, sending it too far into the right top corner for Heurelho Gomes to reach. Despite a few missed close chances from Dimitar Berbatov, Park Ji-Sung and Kiko Macheda, the score remained 2–0 for the remainder of the match.

The semi-final draw was made on 2 December 2009 and paired United with local rivals Manchester City. The two-legged tie was the first time in nearly six years that the two sides had met in a cup tie, and the first time in over 40 years that they had played in a semi-final. The first leg was scheduled to take place at the City of Manchester Stadium on 6 January 2010, but although the pitch was playable, snow in the north of England the previous day caused the Greater Manchester Police to advise the postponement of the match for the safety of travelling supporters. The first leg was then scheduled for 19 January 2010 – the original date for the second leg, which was played on 27 January.

United took the lead after 17 minutes of the first leg; Antonio Valencia was found in open space on the right wing and the Ecuadorian beat Craig Bellamy before putting in a low cross. Wayne Rooney reached the ball first, and although his shot was saved, the ball fell to Ryan Giggs, who was left with a simple finish from two yards out in the middle of the goal. City equalised shortly before half-time via a controversial penalty from Carlos Tevez; the penalty was awarded by referee Mike Dean for a pull on Bellamy by United right-back Rafael, but the Brazilian appeared to have let go of the City forward after the original foul had been committed outside the penalty area. City then took the lead halfway through the second half, Tevez again getting on the scoresheet after the United defence had failed to deal with a City corner. United pressed for an equaliser, but they were continually denied by reflex saves from City goalkeeper Shay Given, and City took a 2–1 lead into the second leg at Old Trafford.

United set the pace at the start of the second leg, but it was City who made the better chances. Nevertheless, the first half passed without a goal, and United took the lead after seven minutes of the second half; City won a corner, which Craig Bellamy went across to take, but the Welsh forward was struck by missiles thrown from the United crowd. When the corner was eventually taken, the ball was cleared to Wayne Rooney, who beat his marker with a sharp turn before hitting a long diagonal ball to Ryan Giggs on the right wing. The Welshman played the ball into the box, where neither Nani nor Michael Carrick were able to get shots away, but the ball broke to Paul Scholes on the edge of the penalty area and the veteran hit a low shot into the bottom corner of the net. Carrick doubled United's lead with 20 minutes left to play, passing the ball in off the far post after a lay-off from man-of-the-match Darren Fletcher, but Carlos Tevez drew City level on aggregate five minutes later as he stretched his leg around Rio Ferdinand to flick home Craig Bellamy's left-wing cross. With the scores level going into injury time, the tie was set for a further 30 minutes of play, but Giggs played a short corner before receiving the return ball and crossing into the six-yard box, where Wayne Rooney had stolen in to head past Shay Given. The goal secured a 3–1 win for United (4–3 on aggregate) and a place in the 2010 Football League Cup Final, their second League Cup final in a row and their third in five years.

In a repeat of the 1994 final, United's opponents in the final were Aston Villa. They beat Blackburn Rovers 7–4 on aggregate (including a 6–4 home win in the second leg) to reach their first League Cup final for 14 years and their first Wembley final since the 2000 FA Cup Final.

United won the final 2–1. James Milner's fifth-minute penalty, awarded after Nemanja Vidić fouled Gabriel Agbonlahor, gave Aston Villa an early lead, but Michael Owen equalised seven minutes later after Richard Dunne gave the ball away. Park Ji-sung hit the post late in the first half, but Wayne Rooney's header from Antonio Valencia's cross gave United the win. Moments after he scored what turned out to be the winning goal, Rooney also hit the post with another header from another Valencia cross. But that counted for nothing as United held on to win their first silverware of the season. It was United's first successful cup tournament defence in history.

Date	Round	Opponents	H / A	Result F–A	Scorers	Attendance
23 September 2009	Round 3	Wolverhampton Wanderers	H	1–0	Welbeck 66'	51,160
27 October 2009	Round 4	Barnsley	A	2–0	Welbeck 6', Owen 59'	20,019
1 December 2009	Round 5	Tottenham Hotspur	H	2–0	Gibson (2) 16', 38'	57,212
19 January 2010	Semi-final; First leg	Manchester City	A	1–2	Giggs 17'	46,067
27 January 2010	Semi-final; Second leg	Manchester City	H	3–1	Scholes 52', Carrick 71', Rooney 90+2'	74,576
28 February 2010	Final	Aston Villa	N	2–1	Owen 12', Rooney 74'	88,596

== UEFA Champions League ==
=== Group stage ===
The draw for the group stage of the Champions League took place in Monaco on 27 August 2009. As one of the top eight-ranked sides in Europe, Manchester United were seeded in Pot 1, meaning that, as well as the three other English sides in the competition, they would avoid Sevilla, Milan, Bayern Munich and their opponents in the 2009 UEFA Champions League Final, Barcelona. However, they could still be paired with clubs such as Real Madrid, Internazionale or Juventus, amongst others. Eventually, they were drawn into Group B with three clubs they had never played before: CSKA Moscow of Russia, Beşiktaş of Turkey and Wolfsburg of Germany.

United opened their Champions League campaign with a 1–0 away win over Beşiktaş on 15 September. Paul Scholes headed in the winning goal in the 77th minute after Nani's shot had been saved by Hakan Arıkan. The Portuguese winger cut inside off the left wing, hit a shot that was too hot for the Beşiktaş goalkeeper to handle and the ball rebounded into the path of Scholes, whose header went in off the post.

For the next match, two weeks later, United played host to the German champions, Wolfsburg, at Old Trafford. Wolfsburg began the game strongly, imposing themselves physically on the pitch, but although United had the upper hand by the end of the half, the teams went into the half-time interval at 0–0. After the break, United continued to create chances, but it was Wolfsburg who got the opening goal through striker Edin Džeko. Michael Carrick committed a foul on the edge of his penalty area, but the referee allowed play to continue as Wolfsburg were still in possession. The ball was crossed in by Makoto Hasebe and Džeko rose above Patrice Evra at the far post to head past Tomasz Kuszczak. United responded immediately through a Ryan Giggs free-kick that took a large deflection off Christian Gentner in the Wolfsburg wall, wrong-footing goalkeeper Diego Benaglio, and found the bottom corner of the goal for Giggs' 150th for Manchester United. In the 78th minute, United won a throw-in on the left side, from which Evra found Wayne Rooney. Rooney played the ball in to Dimitar Berbatov in the Wolfsburg penalty area, but the Bulgarian was unable to make room for a shot and laid the ball off to Giggs. Likewise, Giggs could not find a shooting angle and chose to nudge the ball back to Carrick, who curled it into the far corner from outside the area. United protected their lead for the remaining 12 minutes, and the win took them to the top of their group.

For the first of their two matches against CSKA Moscow, on 21 October, United travelled to the Luzhniki Stadium, the venue for their 2008 UEFA Champions League Final victory. However, they were without Ryan Giggs, Patrice Evra, Park Ji-sung, Darren Fletcher and Wayne Rooney, who were all unavailable due to injury. The stadium's artificial pitch had caused some concern prior to the game, but although CSKA were more used to the surface, United also settled on the unfamiliar turf and the match became cagey, resulting in a goalless first half. The match remained goalless until the 86th minute, when Antonio Valencia fired a shot past CSKA goalkeeper Igor Akinfeev to secure a 1–0 win. The ball was flicked on to Valencia from Nani's left-wing cross by Dimitar Berbatov, and the Ecuadorian's shot was too powerful to stop. The result gave United their first win in six matches against Russian opposition. It also maintained their unbeaten away record in the UEFA Champions League, which stretched back 14 matches to May 2007, when they lost to Milan in the semi-finals. The streak drew United level with Ajax, whose streak was ended by Juventus in the 1996–97 semi-finals.

The return match with CSKA Moscow was played at Old Trafford two weeks later, on 3 November. Following the birth of his first son, Wayne Rooney was dropped to the bench, and United had to continue without their first-choice centre-backs, Rio Ferdinand and Nemanja Vidić. Dimitar Berbatov was also absent through injury, meaning that Federico Macheda partnered Michael Owen up front for his first Champions League appearance. After Alan Dzagoev opened the scoring for CSKA with a powerful shot past Van der Sar from a narrow angle in the 25th minute, Owen equalised just four minutes later as the ball broke to him in the goal area and he passed it under the advancing Akinfeev. However, CSKA retook the lead almost immediately through Miloš Krasić, and Vasili Berezutski doubled their lead shortly after half-time. The score remained at 3–1 until the 84th minute, when Gary Neville crossed a free-kick, which deflected off Nani for Paul Scholes to head home. Antonio Valencia then salvaged a draw for United in injury time, firing in a long-range shot that looked to be going wide until it took a wicked deflection off Georgi Schennikov. With Wolfsburg beating Beşiktaş 3–0 in Istanbul, the draw was enough to secure United's passage through to the knockout stage of the competition, although they were yet to clinch top spot in the group.

United lost their home game 1–0 to Beşiktaş but clinched first place in their group after beating Wolfsburg 3–1 away. Michael Owen scored all three goals, claiming his first Manchester United hat trick.

Date	Opponents	H / A	Result F–A	Scorers	Attendance	Group position
15 September 2009	Beşiktaş	A	1–0	Scholes 77'	26,448	2nd
30 September 2009	Wolfsburg	H	2–1	Giggs 59', Carrick 78'	74,037	1st
21 October 2009	CSKA Moscow	A	1–0	Valencia 86'	51,250	1st
3 November 2009	CSKA Moscow	H	3–3	Owen 29', Scholes 84', Valencia 90+2'	73,718	1st
25 November 2009	Beşiktaş	H	0–1		74,242	1st
8 December 2009	Wolfsburg	A	3–1	Owen (3) 44', 83', 90+1'	26,490	1st

Pos	Team	Pld	W	D	L	GF	GA	GD	Pts	Qualification
1	(England) Manchester United	6	4	1	1	10	6	+4	13	Advance to knockout phase
2	(Russia) CSKA Moscow	6	3	1	2	10	10	0	10	Advance to knockout phase
3	(Germany) VfL Wolfsburg	6	2	1	3	9	8	+1	7	Transfer to Europa League
4	(Turkey) Beşiktaş	6	1	1	4	3	8	−5	4	

Source: RSSSF

=== Knockout phase ===
The draw for the first knockout round of the Champions League was made in Nyon, Switzerland, on 18 December 2009. United, as group winners, could have faced such teams as Bayern Munich and Internazionale, but were ultimately paired with Milan. This presented the possibility of former player David Beckham facing United for the first time since he was sold to Real Madrid in 2003.

Beckham started the first leg on the right side of the Milan midfield and played a major part in the build-up to the first goal of the game; in the third minute, Patrice Evra gave away a free-kick 35 yards from goal, which Beckham crossed into the penalty area. Evra himself attempted an acrobatic clearance, but the ball only went as far as Ronaldinho on the edge of the penalty area. The Brazilian forward volleyed the ball towards goal, and United goalkeeper Edwin van der Sar dropped to his right to block its trajectory; however, Michael Carrick got in the way first and it deflected off his legs and past Van der Sar. United then survived several lapses in concentration throughout the first half before Paul Scholes got their equaliser with 10 minutes left in the half; Darren Fletcher pulled a low cross back from the right side of the penalty area, and Scholes shaped to hit the ball with his right foot. He missed the ball, but it hit his standing leg and spun into the far corner of the goal past Dida's outstretched hand. United took the lead halfway through the second half via Wayne Rooney; Antonio Valencia was played the ball on the right wing, and he beat Milan left-back Giuseppe Favalli before standing up a cross to the far post, which Rooney headed looping back over Dida's head. Eight minutes later, Rooney was on the scoresheet again as he ran unmarked into the Milan penalty area and headed Fletcher's lobbed pass past a static Dida. Clarence Seedorf pulled a goal back for Milan with five minutes left in the game, flicking the ball behind his right leg with his left foot, but United held on to win the match 3–2 and take three away goals back to Old Trafford.

The second leg was played three weeks later on 10 March. Wayne Rooney had missed United's previous match against Wolverhampton Wanderers with an injury, but he was passed fit for the Milan game. Meanwhile, David Beckham was left on the bench for Milan, and so he would have to wait to make his Old Trafford return. At the start of play, Milan needed to score at least two goals to stand a chance of going through to the quarter-finals, but United put the tie almost beyond doubt in the 13th minute; captain Gary Neville swung in a pin-point cross from deep on the right side and Rooney nodded the ball past Christian Abbiati for his ninth consecutive headed goal. The score remained at 1–0 going into half-time, but Rooney doubled the lead within a minute of the restart, sliding the ball under the advancing Abbiati after Nani had played him in with a perfectly weighted cross with the outside of his right foot. Park Ji-sung made it three on the night with a low shot to the far corner of the net after Scholes played him in with a disguised pass in the 59th minute. Beckham came on to rapturous applause five minutes later, and forced a save from Edwin van der Sar with a powerful volley from the edge of the area, but Darren Fletcher sealed a 4–0 win (7–2 on aggregate) with a header from Rafael's deep cross.

The draw for the quarter-finals, semi-finals and final took place in Nyon on 19 March 2010. Unlike the round of 16 draw, there was no seeding or country protection in this draw, meaning that United could be drawn against fellow English side Arsenal or their Group B opponents CSKA Moscow. However, they were eventually drawn against Group A runners-up Bayern Munich, who they had famously played in the 1999 final. The first leg of the quarter-final will be played on 30 March 2010, while the second leg will be played a week later on 7 April. The semi-final draw took place immediately after the quarter-final draw, and United and Bayern were paired with the winners of the all-French quarter-final between Lyon and Bordeaux.

United got off to the perfect start as Wayne Rooney scored after just 64 seconds in the first leg at the Allianz Arena against Bayern. However, for the remainder of the game United were poor and Bayern looked very likely to score an equaliser. That the equaliser came was no surprise, but that it took over 70 minutes to come was. Franck Ribéry fired a free-kick which took a deflection off Rooney and into the back of the net. United managed to hold on until deep into injury-time when Ivica Olić scored from close range after Patrice Evra dithered on the ball. To make matters worse, Wayne Rooney was injured in the build-up to the late winner and was reported to be unavailable for the return leg at Old Trafford eight days later.

However, the second leg saw Wayne Rooney get a surprise start after Sir Alex had claimed that he wouldn't risk making the injury any worse. The striker got involved early by setting up Darron Gibson's third-minute goal to give United the advantage. Four minutes later, Nani scored a second with a clever flick set up by Antonio Valencia. Nani netted again with a strike from range after Rooney had failed to control Rafael's cross. With a two-goal advantage on aggregate and an away goal from the first leg, United were in the driving seat but a close range goal from Olić before half time altered the mood, meaning that Bayern only needed one more goal to be heading through. In the second half, an early sending off for Rafael weakened the side and chances came few and far between, especially as Nani was left to play alone up front following Rooney being substituted for John O'Shea. The reds came close to perhaps sealing the game when Evra put Nani through on goal, but the winger was unable to beat the goalkeeper. With quarter of an hour to go, Arjen Robben volleyed into the low left hand corner and put Bayern Munich back in the driving seat, levelling the aggregate score. The score remained the same until the end and United were knocked out on away goals.

Date	Round	Opponents	H / A	Result F–A	Scorers	Attendance
16 February 2010	First knockout round First leg	Milan	A	3–2	Scholes 36', Rooney (2) 66', 74'	78,587
10 March 2010	First knockout round Second leg	Milan	H	4–0	Rooney (2) 13', 46', Park 59', Fletcher 88'	74,595
30 March 2010	Quarter-final; First leg	Bayern Munich	A	1–2	Rooney 2'	66,000
7 April 2010	Quarter-final; Second leg	Bayern Munich	H	3–2	Gibson 3', Nani (2) 7', 41'	74,482

== Squad statistics ==
No.	Pos.	Name	League		FA Cup		League Cup		Europe		Other		Total		Discipline	
No.	Pos.	Name	Apps	Goals	Apps	Goals	Apps	Goals	Apps	Goals	Apps	Goals	Apps	Goals	Yellow card	Red card
1	GK	(Netherlands) Edwin van der Sar	21	0	0	0	2	0	6	0	0	0	29	0	1	0
2	DF	(England) Gary Neville (c)	15(2)	0	1	0	3(1)	0	6	0	0	0	25(3)	0	4	1
3	DF	(France) Patrice Evra	37(1)	0	0	0	3	0	7(2)	0	1	0	48(3)	0	7	0
4	MF	(England) Owen Hargreaves	0(1)	0	0	0	0	0	0	0	0	0	0(1)	0	0	0
5	DF	(England) Rio Ferdinand	12(1)	0	0	0	1	0	6	0	1	0	20(1)	0	0	0
6	DF	(England) Wes Brown	18(1)	0	1	0	4(1)	0	2(2)	0	0	0	25(4)	0	2	0
7	FW	(England) Michael Owen	5(14)	3	0(1)	0	3(1)	2	3(3)	4	0(1)	0	11(20)	9	1	0
8	MF	(Brazil) Anderson	10(4)	1	1	0	3	0	5	0	0	0	19(4)	1	1	0
9	FW	(Bulgaria) Dimitar Berbatov	24(9)	12	1	0	2	0	1(5)	0	1	0	29(14)	12	3	0
10	FW	(England) Wayne Rooney	32	26	1	0	2(1)	2	6(1)	5	1	1	42(2)	34	8	0
11	MF	(Wales) Ryan Giggs	20(5)	5	0(1)	0	2	1	1(2)	1	0(1)	0	23(9)	7	0	0
12	GK	(England) Ben Foster	9	0	0	0	1	0	2	0	1	0	13	0	0	0
13	MF	(South Korea) Park Ji-sung	10(7)	3	0	0	2	0	5(1)	1	1	0	18(8)	4	0	0
14	MF	(Serbia) Zoran Tošić	0	0	0	0	0(2)	0	0	0	0	0	0(2)	0	1	0
15	DF	(Serbia) Nemanja Vidić	24	1	0	0	2	0	7	0	0	0	33	1	12	1
16	MF	(England) Michael Carrick	22(8)	3	0	0	4(1)	1	6(2)	1	1	0	33(11)	5	3	1
17	MF	(Portugal) Nani	19(4)	3	0	0	2	0	8	2	1	1	30(4)	6	2	1
18	MF	(England) Paul Scholes	24(4)	3	0	0	1(1)	1	7	3	0(1)	0	32(6)	7	13	1
19	FW	(England) Danny Welbeck	1(4)	0	1	0	3	2	2	0	0	0	7(4)	2	0	0
20	DF	(Brazil) Fabio	1(4)	0	1	0	2	0	2	0	0(1)	0	6(5)	0	1	1
21	DF	(Brazil) Rafael	8	1	0	0	4	0	3(1)	0	0	0	15(1)	1	5	1
22	DF	(Republic of Ireland) John O'Shea	12(3)	1	0	0	0	0	2(1)	0	1	0	15(4)	1	0	0
23	DF	(Northern Ireland) Jonny Evans	18	0	1	0	5	0	3	0	1	0	28	0	2	0
24	MF	(Scotland) Darren Fletcher	29(1)	4	0	0	3	0	6(1)	1	1	0	39(2)	5	7	1
25	MF	(Ecuador) Antonio Valencia	29(5)	5	0(1)	0	2(2)	0	6(3)	2	0(1)	0	37(12)	7	3	0
26	FW	(France) Gabriel Obertan	1(6)	0	1	0	2	0	1(2)	0	0	0	5(8)	0	1	0
27	FW	(Italy) Federico Macheda	1(4)	1	0	0	2(1)	0	2	0	0	0	5(5)	1	1	0
28	MF	(Republic of Ireland) Darron Gibson	6(9)	2	1	0	2(1)	2	3(1)	1	0	0	12(11)	5	4	0
29	GK	(Poland) Tomasz Kuszczak	8	0	1	0	3	0	2	0	0	0	14	0	0	0
30	DF	(Belgium) Ritchie De Laet	2	0	0	0	1(2)	0	0	0	0	0	3(2)	0	1	0
31	MF	(Northern Ireland) Corry Evans	0	0	0	0	0	0	0	0	0	0	0	0	0	0
32	FW	(Senegal) Mame Biram Diouf	0(5)	1	0	0	0(1)	0	0	0	0	0	0(6)	1	1	0
33	MF	(England) Sam Hewson	0	0	0	0	0	0	0	0	0	0	0	0	0	0
35	MF	(England) Tom Cleverley	0	0	0	0	0	0	0	0	0	0	0	0	0	0
36	DF	(Scotland) David Gray	0	0	0	0	0	0	0	0	0	0	0	0	0	0
37	DF	(Northern Ireland) Craig Cathcart	0	0	0	0	0	0	0	0	0	0	0	0	0	0
38	GK	(Germany) Ron-Robert Zieler	0	0	0	0	0	0	0	0	0	0	0	0	0	0
39	DF	(England) James Chester	0	0	0	0	0	0	0	0	0	0	0	0	0	0
40	GK	(England) Ben Amos	0	0	0	0	0	0	0	0	0	0	0	0	0	0
41	FW	(Norway) Joshua King	0	0	0	0	0(1)	0	0	0	0	0	0(1)	0	0	0
42	MF	(Norway) Magnus Eikrem	0	0	0	0	0	0	0	0	0	0	0	0	0	0
43	MF	(England) Matty James	0	0	0	0	0	0	0	0	0	0	0	0	0	0
44	DF	(Northern Ireland) Joe Dudgeon	0	0	0	0	0	0	0	0	0	0	0	0	0	0
45	DF	(England) Oliver Gill	0	0	0	0	0	0	0	0	0	0	0	0	0	0
46	MF	(England) Cameron Stewart	0	0	0	0	0	0	0	0	0	0	0	0	0	0
47	MF	(Northern Ireland) Oliver Norwood	0	0	0	0	0	0	0	0	0	0	0	0	0	0
–	–	Own goals	–	11	–	0	–	0	–	0	–	0	–	11	–	–

Statistics accurate as of match played 9 May 2010

== Transfers ==
United announced early in the transfer window that they had agreed a world record fee of £80 million to sell Cristiano Ronaldo to Real Madrid. Shortly after this, they confirmed that Carlos Tevez, who had been on loan with the club for two seasons, had not taken up the offer of a permanent contract. Tevez would later sign for United's local rivals, Manchester City. Lee Martin, Fraizer Campbell, Richard Eckersley and Manucho also left the club for an undisclosed fee.

After the departures of Ronaldo and Tevez, United sought a new striker, and Karim Benzema (who eventually signed for Real Madrid) was one player they courted. Despite the record deal for Ronaldo, United opted for a cheaper deal in the end, signing free agent Michael Owen after his contract with Newcastle United had expired. The signing of a former Liverpool star caused some consternation amongst supporters of both clubs. Antonio Valencia and Gabriel Obertan also joined, and Alex Ferguson announced that his buying for the transfer window was over. However, a few days later, Mame Biram Diouf also signed; the club explained that Diouf was originally going to sign in the next January transfer window, but that they had hurried the signing after other clubs became interested in the player.

In the winter transfer window, Danny Simpson left for Newcastle United. Goalkeeper Ben Foster left in May, signing for Birmingham City. Both Simpson and Foster left for undisclosed fees.

=== In ===
Date	Pos.	Name	From	Fee
3 July 2009	FW	(England) Michael Owen	Unattached	Free
8 July 2009	FW	(France) Gabriel Obertan	(France) Bordeaux	Undisclosed
30 July 2009	FW	(Senegal) Mame Biram Diouf	(Norway) Molde	Undisclosed

=== Out ===
Date	Pos.	Name	To	Fee
1 July 2009	MF	(Portugal) Cristiano Ronaldo	(Spain) Real Madrid	£80m
6 July 2009	MF	(England) Lee Martin	(England) Ipswich Town	Undisclosed
11 July 2009	FW	(England) Fraizer Campbell	(England) Sunderland	£3.5m
15 July 2009	DF	(England) Richard Eckersley	(England) Burnley	Tribunal (£500k)
17 July 2009	FW	(Angola) Manucho	(Spain) Real Valladolid	Undisclosed
20 January 2010	DF	(England) Danny Simpson	(England) Newcastle United	Undisclosed
19 May 2010	GK	(England) Ben Foster	(England) Birmingham City	Undisclosed

=== Loan out ===
Date from	Date to	Pos.	Name	Moving to
2 July 2009	30 June 2010	MF	(Italy) Rodrigo Possebon	(Portugal) Braga
5 August 2009	31 December 2009	FW	(Senegal) Mame Biram Diouf	(Norway) Molde
13 August 2009	30 June 2010	MF	(England) Daniel Drinkwater	(England) Huddersfield Town
14 August 2009	18 January 2010	DF	(England) Danny Simpson	(England) Newcastle United
14 August 2009	14 November 2009	GK	(England) Tom Heaton	(England) Queens Park Rangers
17 August 2009	30 June 2010	MF	(England) Tom Cleverley	(England) Watford
31 August 2009	30 September 2009	DF	(England) Scott Moffatt	(England) Altrincham
15 September 2009	4 January 2010	DF	(Northern Ireland) Craig Cathcart	(England) Watford
21 September 2009	19 December 2009	DF	(Scotland) David Gray	(England) Plymouth Argyle
21 September 2009	19 December 2009	DF	(England) James Chester	(England) Plymouth Argyle
29 October 2009	25 November 2009	GK	(England) Ben Amos	(England) Peterborough United
6 November 2009	16 January 2010	FW	(England) Febian Brandy	(England) Gillingham
13 November 2009	31 January 2010	GK	(England) Tom Heaton	(England) Rochdale
25 January 2010	30 June 2010	FW	(England) Danny Welbeck	(England) Preston North End
27 January 2010	30 June 2010	MF	(Serbia) Zoran Tošić	(Germany) Köln
1 February 2010	8 May 2010	MF	(England) Sam Hewson	(England) Bury
9 February 2010	12 May 2010	MF	(England) Matty James	(England) Preston North End
12 February 2010	8 May 2010	GK	(England) Tom Heaton	(England) Wycombe Wanderers
15 March 2010	10 June 2010	GK	(England) Ben Amos	(Norway) Molde
