= Les Kershaw =

English football scout and academy director

Les Kershaw is the former chief scout and Academy Director for Manchester United.

Kershaw studied at Manchester Metropolitan University before being recruited by United manager Alex Ferguson. He had previously acted as a part-time scout for Arsenal.

He received an award from the Royal Society of Chemistry in September 2005.

Kershaw retired at the end of the 2005–06 season and was replaced as Director of the Academy by Brian McClair. However, he continued to work for United part-time, and was credited with discovering Rafael and Fabio.

== See also ==
- Manchester United F.C. Reserves and Academy
