= Fabio (footballer, born 1990) =

Brazilian former footballer (born 1990)

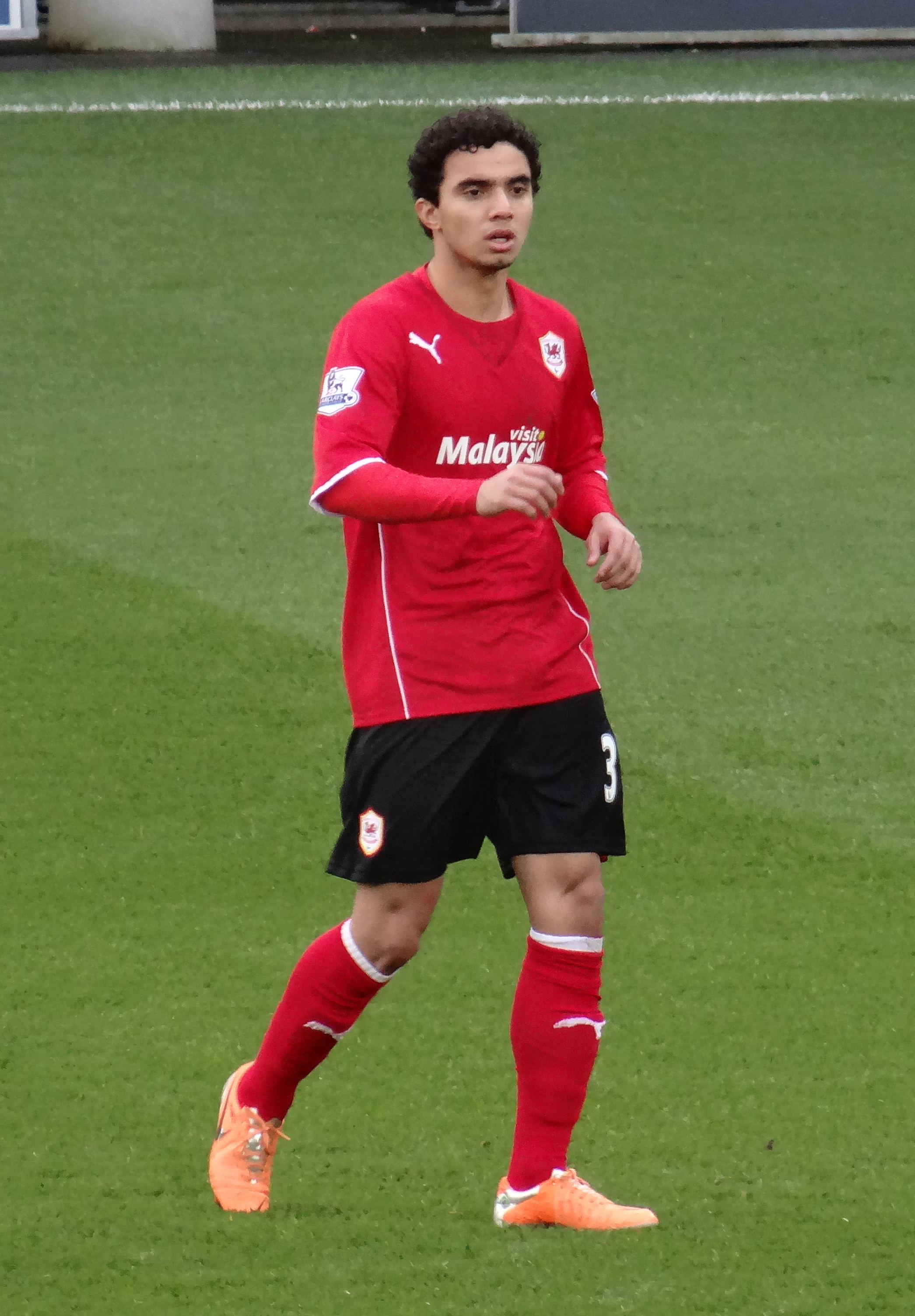
- Fabio playing for Cardiff City in 2014

Personal information
- Full name: Fabio Pereira da Silva
- Date of birth: 9 July 1990 (age 36)
- Place of birth: Petrópolis, Rio de Janeiro, Brazil
- Height: 1.72 m (5 ft 8 in)
- Position: Full-back

Youth career
- 2005–2008: Fluminense

Senior career*
Years	Team	Apps	(Gls)
2008–2014	Manchester United	22	(1)
2012–2013	→ Queens Park Rangers (loan)	21	(0)
2014–2016	Cardiff City	65	(1)
2016–2018	Middlesbrough	48	(1)
2018–2022	Nantes	85	(0)
2023–2024	Grêmio	42	(1)
Total		283	(4)

International career
2007	Brazil U17 (Note: Only includes 2007 FIFA U-17 World Cup and 2007 South American Under-17 Football Championship)	13	(10)
2011	Brazil	2	(0)
- * Club domestic league appearances and goals as of 18 August 2024

Fabio Pereira da Silva (Brazilian Portuguese: [ˈfabju peˈɾejɾɐ dɐ ˈsiwvɐ]; born 9 July 1990), known as Fabio, is a Brazilian former professional footballer who last played as a full-back for Campeonato Brasileiro Série A club Grêmio.

Fabio and his twin brother Rafael began their careers with Fluminense in their native Brazil before being signed by English club Manchester United in February 2007. Unlike his brother, Fabio struggled to hold down a place in the Manchester United first team, and after a loan spell with Queens Park Rangers in 2012–13, he made a permanent move to Cardiff City in January 2014.

Fabio has played for Brazil twice at senior international level, with both appearances coming in 2011, the same year he played for Manchester United in the UEFA Champions League Final against Barcelona and won the Premier League title.

== Early life ==
Fabio was born in Petrópolis, approximately one hour's drive from Rio de Janeiro in Rio de Janeiro state, and began playing football from age five. He and his identical twin Rafael would play five-a-side in the city. They were then spotted by a representative of Fluminense, who gave them the opportunity to play for the club; they went to live at the club's training centre at Xerém when they were just 11 years old.

== Club career ==
=== Fluminense ===
Fabio began his football career as a defensive midfielder with his local club, Boa Esperança, but he was converted to left back when he joined Fluminense. With Fluminense, Fabio took part in the 2005 Nike Premier Cup in Hong Kong, where he was spotted by Manchester United scout Les Kershaw, who remarked that the twins reminded him of "two little whippets". Kershaw then telephoned Manchester United manager Sir Alex Ferguson and recommended that the club sign the Da Silva twins. Manchester United got in touch with Fluminense and asked permission for the twins to travel to Manchester to train with them in 2005. Shortly afterwards, a scout claiming to represent Arsenal visited the twins and asked them to come to England to train with Arsenal without the permission of Fluminense. However, they were dissuaded from this by their mother, who reminded them that they had been with Fluminense since they were 11, and that they should show the club some loyalty. Therefore, they decided to sign for Manchester United over Arsenal, and the two clubs agreed a deal in February 2007. The twins moved to Manchester in January 2008 without ever having played for the Fluminense first team.

=== Manchester United ===
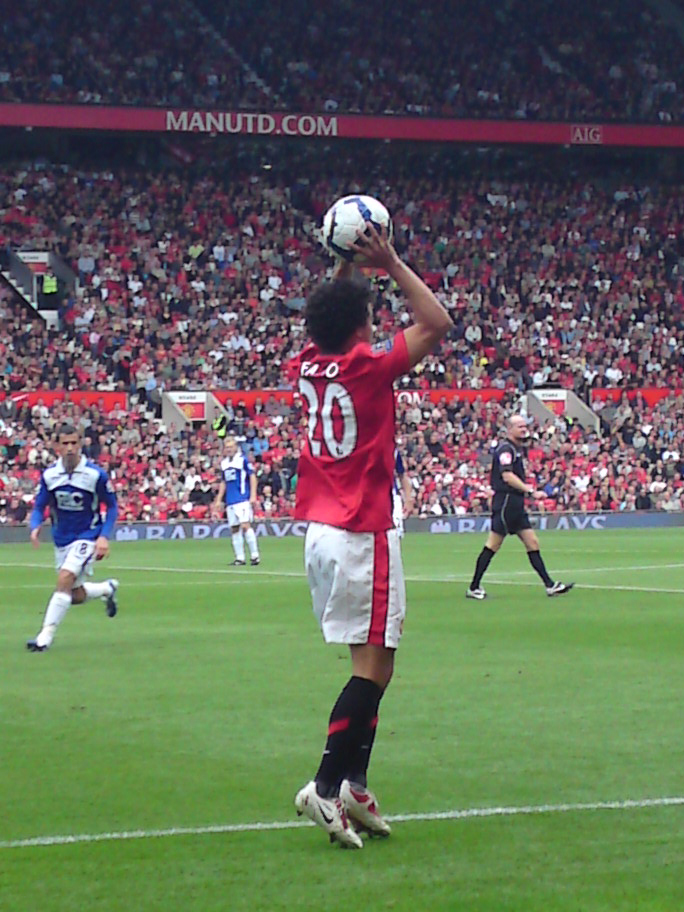
Fabio playing for Manchester United in 2009

Despite signing for the club in February 2007, Fabio was unable to be registered as a Manchester United player or play in matches for the club until his 18th birthday on 9 July 2008. He made his first appearance for Manchester United on 4 August 2008, coming on as a half-time substitute for Patrice Evra in a 2–0 friendly win away to Peterborough United. His performance in that game was praised, with Today claiming that "Manchester United finally found out what they were missing". He has since played in eight matches for the club's reserve team, scoring five goals – including a hat-trick against Rochdale in the Lancashire Senior Cup on 16 March 2009 – and was named on the bench for United's second Premier League match of the season against Portsmouth on 25 August 2008. However, Fabio's competitive debut for the Manchester United first team was delayed by a shoulder injury, which required surgery.

Fabio finally made his debut on 24 January 2009, in the 2–1 FA Cup Fourth Round win over Tottenham Hotspur. However, he incurred an injury to his calf shortly into the second half and had to be replaced by fellow debutant Richard Eckersley. Fabio made his Premier League debut on 16 August, playing at right-back at home to Birmingham City on the opening day of the 2009–10 season. He made his second start of the season at home to Wolverhampton Wanderers in the third round of the League Cup, but was red-carded just short of the half-hour mark for a professional foul on Michael Kightly.

On 21 October, Fabio was handed his UEFA Champions League debut in a 1–0 win over CSKA Moscow. He started the match but came off shortly before the end with an injury. Sir Alex Ferguson expressed his pleasure with Fabio's performance, especially with the match being played on an artificial surface. On 27 October, Fabio was booked for a foul committed by his twin brother Rafael in United's 2–0 League Cup victory over Barnsley. Manchester United appealed and The Football Association ("FA") agreed it was a case of mistaken identity, transferring the card to Rafael. On 1 April 2010, Fabio signed a contract extension with Manchester United that would tie him to the club until at least June 2014. Fabio scored his first goal for United on 26 February 2011, netting the final goal in a 4–0 away win over Wigan Athletic. Just two weeks later, he scored again, netting his first FA Cup goal and first at Old Trafford, opening the scoring from close range in a 2–0 win over Arsenal. On 28 May 2011, Fabio started the UEFA Champions League Final against Barcelona; United lost the match 3–1.

In April 2012, Sir Alex Ferguson announced that, in order to provide him with the first-team experience that Manchester United could not provide at the time, Fabio would go out on loan for the 2012–13 season.

==== Queens Park Rangers (loan) ====
On 2 July 2012, it was announced that Fabio had signed on loan for Queens Park Rangers for the 2012–13 season. His debut came at home to Swansea City on 18 August, and finished as a 5–0 defeat, during which he received a yellow card for a foul on Nathan Dyer. Fabio scored his first goal for QPR against Milton Keynes Dons in an FA Cup match they went on to lose 4–2.

=== Cardiff City ===
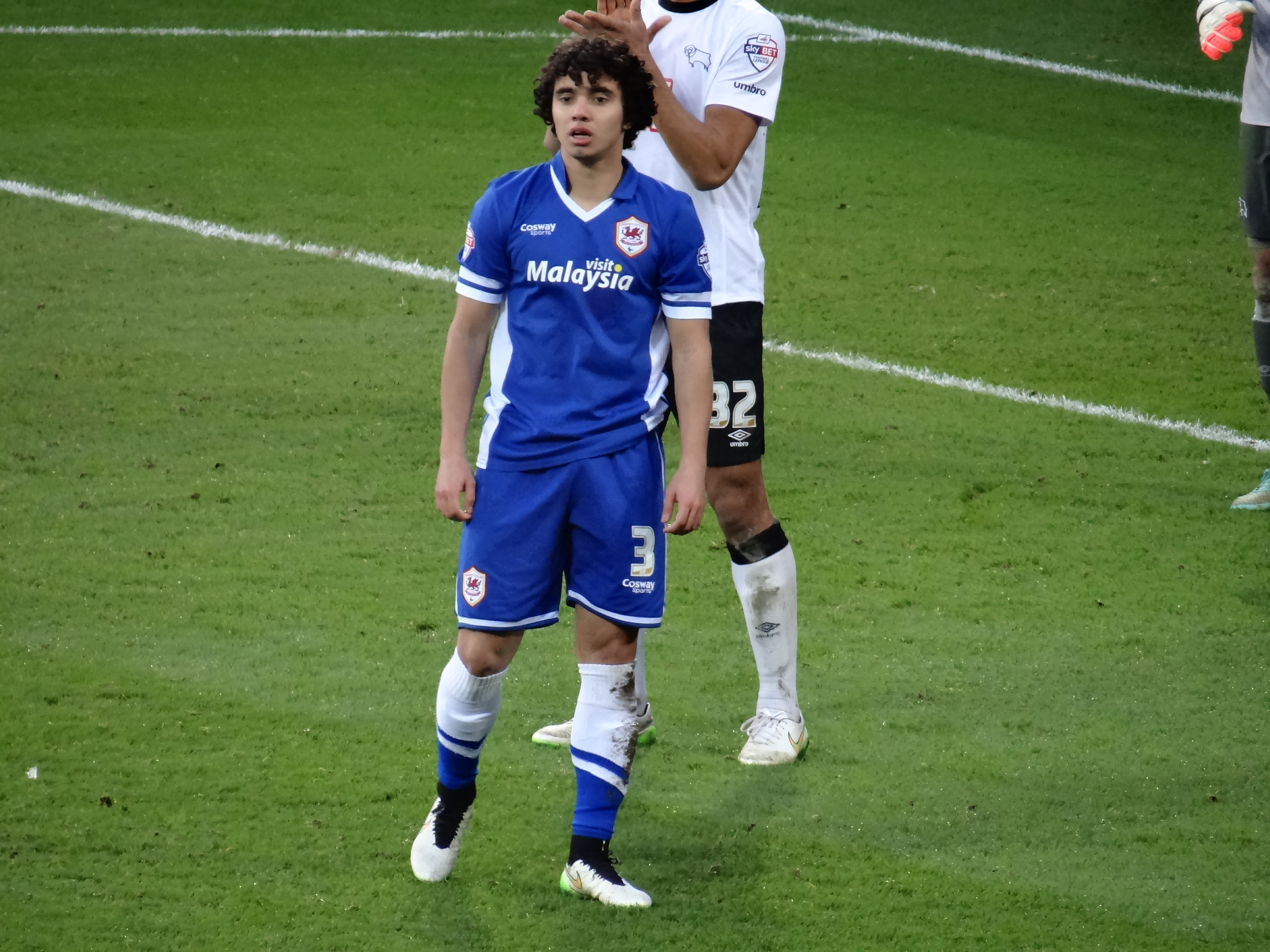
Fabio playing for Cardiff City in 2015

After his return to Manchester United for the 2013–14 season, Fabio made just three appearances for the club, his final appearance coming in the shock FA Cup third round home defeat to Swansea City in January 2014. Fabio was sent on as a 76th-minute substitute for the injured Rio Ferdinand, but three-and-a-half minutes later received a straight red card for a reckless lunge on José Cañas with the scores level at 1–1. The ten men of United subsequently conceded a 90th-minute goal and were knocked out of the FA Cup at the third round stage for only the second time in 28 years.

Later that month, Manchester United manager David Moyes accepted a bid for Fabio from Cardiff City, and the transfer was completed on 29 January 2014 after Fabio passed a medical the previous weekend. He went on to make his debut in Ole Gunnar Solskjær's first win, against Norwich City, after which he became a regular in the side. However, Cardiff were relegated from the Premier League at the end of the season, meaning an instant return to the Championship.

Fabio was a regular in the starting XI at the start of the following season, although Cardiff struggled under Solskjær, who was sacked and replaced by Russell Slade in October. Fabio was in-and-out of the starting lineup under Slade following the signing of fellow left-back Scott Malone. That season, Cardiff suffered their worst finish in seven years, finishing 11th in the Championship.

During the 2015–16 season, Fabio became a fan favourite in the Welsh capital following some impressive performances. He also scored his first goal in two years, a half-volley from 25 yards against Middlesbrough.

Fabio missed the opening game of the following season, after which Cardiff manager Paul Trollope announced he was in talks with Middlesbrough over a move for Fabio after Middlesbrough activated his release cause.

=== Middlesbrough ===
On 12 August 2016, Fabio joined newly promoted Premier League side Middlesbrough on a two-year contract. He scored his first goal for Middlesbrough in an EFL Cup tie against Scunthorpe United on 22 August 2017.

=== Nantes ===
On 18 July 2018, Fabio joined Ligue 1 side Nantes on a three-year contract.

== International career ==
=== Brazil under-17 ===
Fabio has played internationally for the Brazilian national under-17 team, and was captain of the Brazil team for the 2007 FIFA U-17 World Cup, where he scored twice, making him the team's joint-highest scorer. Despite being a defender, he scored a total of 10 goals in his 13 appearances.

=== Brazil senior squad ===
In September 2011, after a spell of good form with Manchester United, Fabio was rewarded with a place in the Brazil senior squad for the matches against Costa Rica and Mexico on 7 and 11 October 2011 respectively.

== Playing style ==
Along with his brother Rafael, Fabio has been praised for his energetic style, and has been described as an "excellent footballer" by his former manager at Manchester United, Sir Alex Ferguson. Les Kershaw, the former Manchester United academy manager who spotted them, described the pair as being like "two little whippets", praising how "when they got knocked down, they just got straight back up again and got on with it. They were like bouncing balls... very, very quick". The Times has called them "Brazil's answer to the Neville brothers", in reference to defenders Gary and Phil Neville. Based on his attacking ability and instincts, it was suggested on the United website that Fabio, along with Rafael, could be deployed in the midfield rather than in defence.

== Personal life ==
Fabio's twin brother Rafael is also a professional footballer. Both twins signed for Manchester United at the same time in 2008. The twins' elder brother, Luiz Henrique Pereira da Silva, used to play for América-MG in Brazil and Brescia in Italy, but moved with his wife to England when the twins signed for Manchester United. After a six-week wait for international clearance, Luiz Henrique signed for Radcliffe Borough, but he and his wife returned to Brazil in early 2009 in preparation for the birth of their child, where he returned to England few months later.

The wedding ring on Fabio's finger used to be how Sir Alex Ferguson could tell the twins apart, with Fabio already married at age 18 to 17-year-old Barbara, who relocated to England with him. Despite starting their careers at Fluminense, both Fabio and Rafael are actually supporters of Fluminense's local rivals Botafogo.

== Career statistics ==
As of 18 August 2024

Appearances and goals by club, season and competition
Club	Season	League			State league		National cup (Note: Includes FA Cup, Coupe de France)		League cup (Note: Includes Football League/EFL Cup, Coupe de la Ligue)		Europe		Other		Total	
Club	Season	Division	Apps	Goals	Apps	Goals	Apps	Goals	Apps	Goals	Apps	Goals	Apps	Goals	Apps	Goals
Manchester United	2008–09	Premier League	0	0	—		2	0	0	0	0	0	0	0	2	0
Manchester United	2009–10	Premier League	5	0	—		1	0	2	0	2 (Note: Appearances in UEFA Champions League)	0	1 (Note: Appearance in FA Community Shield)	0	11	0
Manchester United	2010–11	Premier League	11	1	—		4	1	2	0	7	0	1	0	25	2
Manchester United	2011–12	Premier League	5	0	—		0	0	3	0	7 (Note: Five appearances in UEFA Champions League, two appearances in UEFA Europa League)	0	0	0	15	0
Manchester United	2013–14	Premier League	1	0	—		1	0	1	1	0	0	0	0	3	1
Manchester United	Total		22	1	—		8	1	8	1	16	0	2	0	56	3
Queens Park Rangers (loan)	2012–13	Premier League	21	0	—		1	1	1	0	—		—		23	1
Cardiff City	2013–14	Premier League	13	0	—		—		—		—		—		13	0
Cardiff City	2014–15	Championship	30	0	—		0	0	0	0	—		—		30	0
Cardiff City	2015–16	Championship	22	1	—		1	0	2	0	—		—		25	1
Cardiff City	Total		65	1	—		1	0	2	0	—		—		68	1
Middlesbrough	2016–17	Premier League	24	0	—		4	0	2	0	—		—		30	0
Middlesbrough	2017–18	Championship	24	1	—		0	0	1	1	—		—		25	2
Middlesbrough	Total		48	1	—		4	0	3	1	—		—		55	2
Nantes	2018–19	Ligue 1	20	0	—		3	0	2	0	—		—		25	0
Nantes	2019–20	Ligue 1	10	0	—		0	0	0	0	—		—		10	0
Nantes	2020–21	Ligue 1	22	0	—		0	0	—		—		0	0	22	0
Nantes	2021–22	Ligue 1	27	0	—		3	0	—		—		—		30	0
Nantes	2022–23	Ligue 1	6	0	—		—		—		2 (Note: Appearances in UEFA Europa League)	0	1 (Note: Appearance in Trophée des Champions)	0	9	0
Nantes	Total		85	0	—		6	0	2	0	2	0	1	0	94	0
Grêmio	2023	Série A	15	0	9	0	4	0	—		—		—		28	0
Grêmio	2024	Série A	12	0	6	1	1	0	—		2	0	—		21	1
Grêmio	Total		27	0	15	1	5	0	—		2	0	—		49	1
Career total			268	3	15	1	25	2	16	2	20	0	3	0	347	8

== Honours ==
Manchester United

- Premier League: 2010–11
- FA Community Shield: 2010
- UEFA Champions League runner-up: 2010–11

Nantes

- Coupe de France: 2021–22

Grêmio

- Campeonato Gaúcho: 2023, 2024
- Recopa Gaúcha: 2023

Brazil U17

- South American U-17 Championship: 2007
