= Michael Carrick =

English footballer and manager (born 1981)

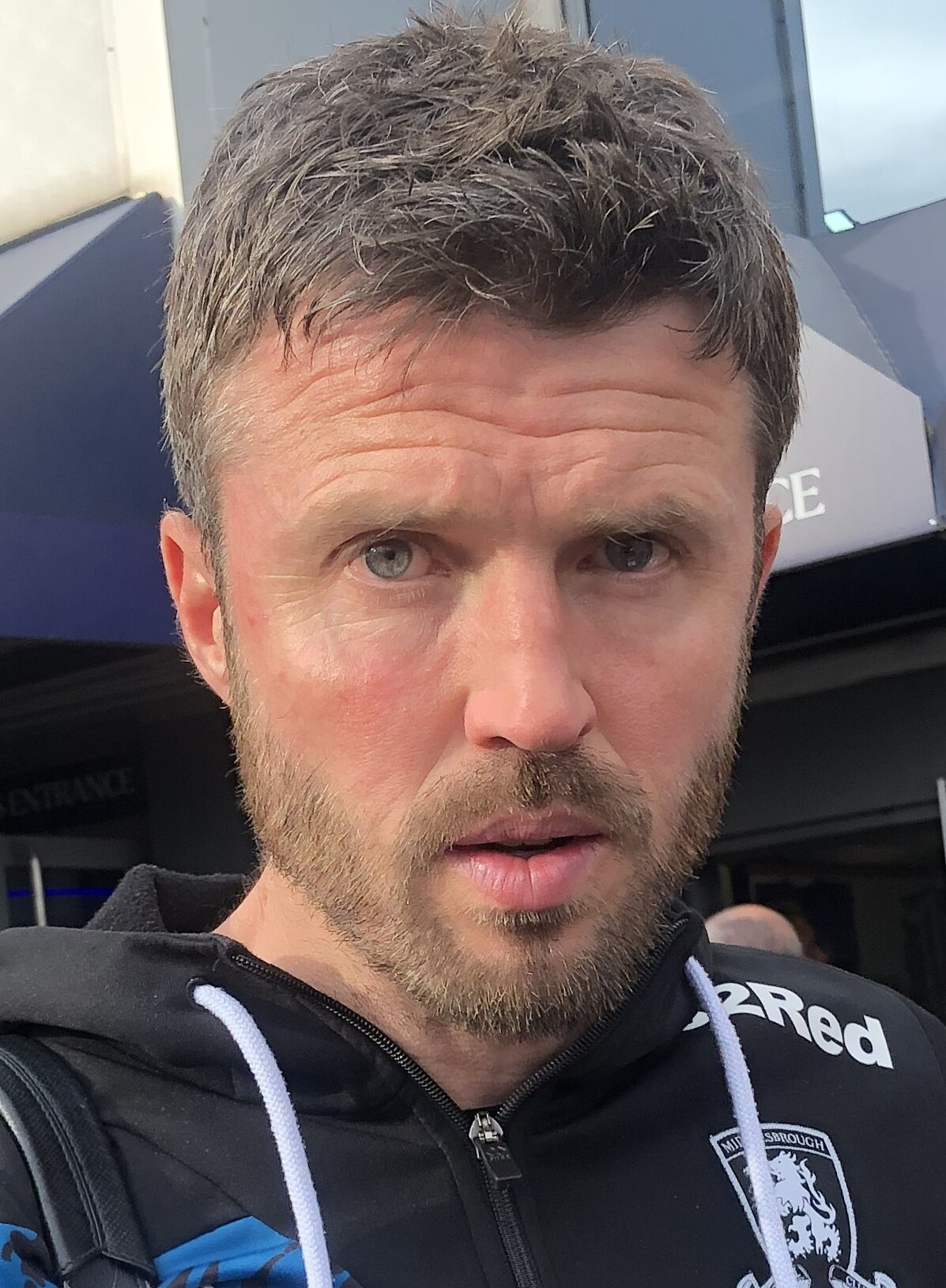
- Carrick as head coach of Middlesbrough in 2025

Personal information
- Full name: Michael Carrick
- Date of birth: 28 July 1981 (age 45)
- Place of birth: Wallsend, Tyne and Wear, England
- Height: 6 ft 2 in (1.88 m)
- Position: Midfielder

Youth career
- 1986–1997: Wallsend Boys Club
- 1997–1999: West Ham United

Senior career*
Years	Team	Apps	(Gls)
1999–2004	West Ham United	136	(6)
1999	→ Swindon Town (loan)	6	(2)
2000	→ Birmingham City (loan)	2	(0)
2004–2006	Tottenham Hotspur	64	(2)
2006–2018	Manchester United	316	(17)
Total		524	(27)

International career
	England U18	4	(0)
2000–2003	England U21	14	(2)
2006	England B	1	(0)
2001–2015	England	34	(0)

Managerial career
- 2021: Manchester United (caretaker)
- 2022–2025: Middlesbrough
- 2026: Manchester United
- * Club domestic league appearances and goals

Michael Carrick (born 28 July 1981) is an English professional football coach and former player who was most recently head coach of Premier League club Manchester United. He is best known for his 12-year playing career with Manchester United, which he also captained in his final season there. Carrick was a midfielder who primarily played in a deep-lying role, but he was also used as an emergency centre-back under Alex Ferguson, David Moyes, Louis van Gaal and José Mourinho. His playing style was grounded in his passing ability.

Carrick began his career at West Ham United, joining the youth team in 1997 and winning the FA Youth Cup two years later. He was sent on loan twice during his debut season, to Swindon Town and Birmingham City, before securing a place in the first team by the 2000–01 season. He experienced relegation in the 2002–03 season, and was voted into the PFA First Division Team of the Year in the following campaign. He made more than 150 appearances for West Ham, and in 2004, he moved to rival London club Tottenham Hotspur for a fee believed to be £3.5 million. He played an influential role at the club for two seasons before being sold to Manchester United in 2006 for £14 million.

From his debut onwards, Carrick was a regular in the Manchester United first team, making more than 50 appearances in his first season with them. He established himself as a key member of the team that won the Premier League in 2006–07, their first title success in four years. The following season he was part of the side that won the 2008 Champions League final, playing the full 120 minutes as they enjoyed a 6–5 penalty shootout win, with Carrick converting his spot kick, to help achieve the European double. As of 2025, he is one of only two English players alongside former teammate Wayne Rooney to win the Premier League title, FA Cup, UEFA Champions League, League Cup, FA Community Shield, UEFA Europa League and FIFA Club World Cup. In winning the 2016 FA Cup, Carrick completed his collection of every domestic honour in the English game.

Carrick has represented England at under-18, under-21, B and senior levels. He made his England debut in 2001 and went on to gain 34 caps without scoring a goal. Carrick was often overlooked during a majority of his England career, with many of his contemporaries being preferred in his position. In the 2012–13 season Carrick established himself as a regular. He was a member of the England squad for two major tournaments, the 2006 and 2010 World Cups.

Following his retirement, Carrick became a first team coach at Manchester United under José Mourinho, and later Ole Gunnar Solskjær, along with having a spell as caretaker manager in 2021. Then in October 2022, Carrick was appointed head coach at Middlesbrough, a role he held until his dismissal in June 2025. He returned to Manchester United as head coach in January 2026, but was dismissed in November after a poor run of results.

== Early life ==
Michael Carrick was born on 28 July 1981 to Vince and Lynn Carrick in Wallsend, Tyne and Wear, and has a younger brother Graeme. He first became involved in football at the age of four. A boyhood fan of Newcastle United, he played five-a-side football with Wallsend Boys Club on Saturday nights, courtesy of his father's volunteer work at the club. Aged nine, he had trials with Middlesbrough, Stoke City, Arsenal, Crystal Palace and Chelsea.

At the age of 12 he was selected for North Tyneside Schools. While playing for Wallsend Boys' Club under-16s, he was capped for the England Boys' club side. At age 13, Carrick was profiled by the BBC children's programme Live & Kicking episode 49, which aired on 4 February 1995. During his school years, and the years up until his move to West Ham United, Carrick actually played as a centre-forward; it was only at West Ham that he started to play more often as a midfielder. He studied at Wallsend's Western Middle School and Burnside Community High School, completing his GCSE exams in 1997.

== Club career ==
=== West Ham United ===
Carrick was part of the West Ham United youth squad that won the FA Youth Cup in the 1998–99 season. He scored twice in their two-legged 9–0 record final victory over Coventry City. According to his manager at the time, Harry Redknapp, Carrick's difficulty at the start of his career was mainly physical and he lost almost two seasons to injuries because of his rapid growth. He made his debut for West Ham in a 1–1 away draw with Jokerit in the UEFA Intertoto Cup on 24 July 1999. His league debut came five weeks later on 28 August, when he replaced Rio Ferdinand in a 3–0 victory over Bradford City at Valley Parade.

In November 1999, Carrick was sent on a one-month loan to Swindon Town and made his first appearance for them in a 0–0 draw at home with Norwich City. He scored his first professional career goal in a 2–1 defeat at home to Charlton Athletic on 23 November. He scored once more during his loan spell, netting in a 1–1 draw at home to Walsall on 4 December. Although he impressed during his spell he could not help the team find a much-needed win during his 6 outings, playing his final game for them in a 3–0 defeat at Manchester City on 18 December. In February 2000, he was sent on loan again, this time to Birmingham City, making just two appearances for the Blues. Carrick returned to Upton Park and scored his first goal for West Ham United, scoring the first in a 5–0 home win over Coventry City on 22 April. During his first season he was voted as West Ham United's Young Player of the Year.

Carrick made his West Ham breakthrough in the 2000–01 season, playing 41 games in all competitions, which included 33 games in the league. His only goal of the season came in a 1–1 home draw against Aston Villa on 9 December 2000. Carrick was awarded a new, improved contract for his progress that would keep him at Upton Park until 2005. On 20 April 2001, he was nominated for the PFA Young Player of the Year alongside teammate Joe Cole. The award was eventually won by Liverpool midfielder Steven Gerrard on 29 April. For the second successive season Carrick was voted as West Ham's Young Player of the Year.

The 2001–02 season saw Carrick make 32 appearances for the club. Carrick scored twice during this season, his first was West Ham's only goal in a 7–1 loss at Blackburn Rovers on 14 October. He scored the first goal in a 2–1 victory over rivals Chelsea ten days later. Towards the end of the season, Carrick suffered a recurrence of a groin injury that ruled him out of the 2002 FIFA World Cup for the England squad.

In the 2002–03 season West Ham were relegated from the Premier League at the end of the campaign, with Carrick playing his last game of the season in a 2–0 victory over Sunderland on 22 March 2003. Rather than leave the club like teammates Joe Cole, Frédéric Kanouté and Jermain Defoe, Carrick stayed with West Ham during their first season back in the First Division. During the 2003–04 season, West Ham finished fourth on the final day to ensure a place in the play-offs. However, they lost 1–0 in the final to Crystal Palace and were denied a return to the top flight. Carrick was included in the PFA Team of the Year for the First Division.

=== Tottenham Hotspur ===
After one season outside the Premier League, Carrick felt compelled to leave the First Division, saying: "The truth is I didn't feel I could play First Division football much longer." He was linked with moves to a number of teams including Portsmouth, Arsenal, Everton, West Bromwich Albion and Crystal Palace before Tottenham Hotspur emerged as front-runners to sign him. On 20 August, a deal was agreed between West Ham and Tottenham for the transfer of Carrick subject to a medical. Four days later, the transfer was official as Carrick joined the club for around £3.5 million after the passing of a medical. He made a goalscoring appearance for the Tottenham reserves, but his first-team debut for the club was delayed after suffering an injury setback on 13 September. Carrick was assigned the number 23 shirt and made his Tottenham debut on 18 October as a substitute in a 1–0 defeat at Portsmouth.

Despite being fit, he was often overlooked by then-manager Jacques Santini. It was unclear whether Santini really wanted him at all, for there was much media speculation that Carrick was bought by Tottenham's Director of Football Frank Arnesen rather than Santini. However, following the departure of Santini and the appointment of new manager Martin Jol he soon emerged as a regular starter in midfield. His first full start for Tottenham was also Jol's first game in charge of the club away to Burnley in the League Cup on 9 November. During the game he assisted a goal for Robbie Keane as they went on to win 3–0. On 18 December, he produced a display that was influential in helping Tottenham to a 5–1 win at home over Southampton. Carrick subsequently ended the 2004–05 season with 29 league appearances, but failed to score as the team finished the table in ninth position and missed out on a UEFA Cup spot.

On 3 December 2005, Carrick scored his first Tottenham goal as he netted the winner in a 3–2 home win over Sunderland. He scored his second goal for the club on 8 April 2006 in a 2–1 win at home over Manchester City. On 22 April, Carrick was lauded for his performance, which helped Tottenham to a 1–1 away draw in the North London derby against Arsenal. On 7 May, Carrick was one of 10 Tottenham players who fell ill at a hotel just before their final game of the season away to West Ham as the players suffered from an outbreak of norovirus, which was initially reported and widely misconceived to have been food poisoning. Carrick managed to play in the game but lasted just 63 minutes in the 2–1 defeat to his former club. As a result of the loss rivals Arsenal beat them to fourth place in the league and the spot for the Champions League. He made more crosses and more passes than any other Tottenham player during the 2005–06 season, and along with Mido was joint top in assists.

=== Manchester United ===
==== 2006–2009: Title success and European double ====
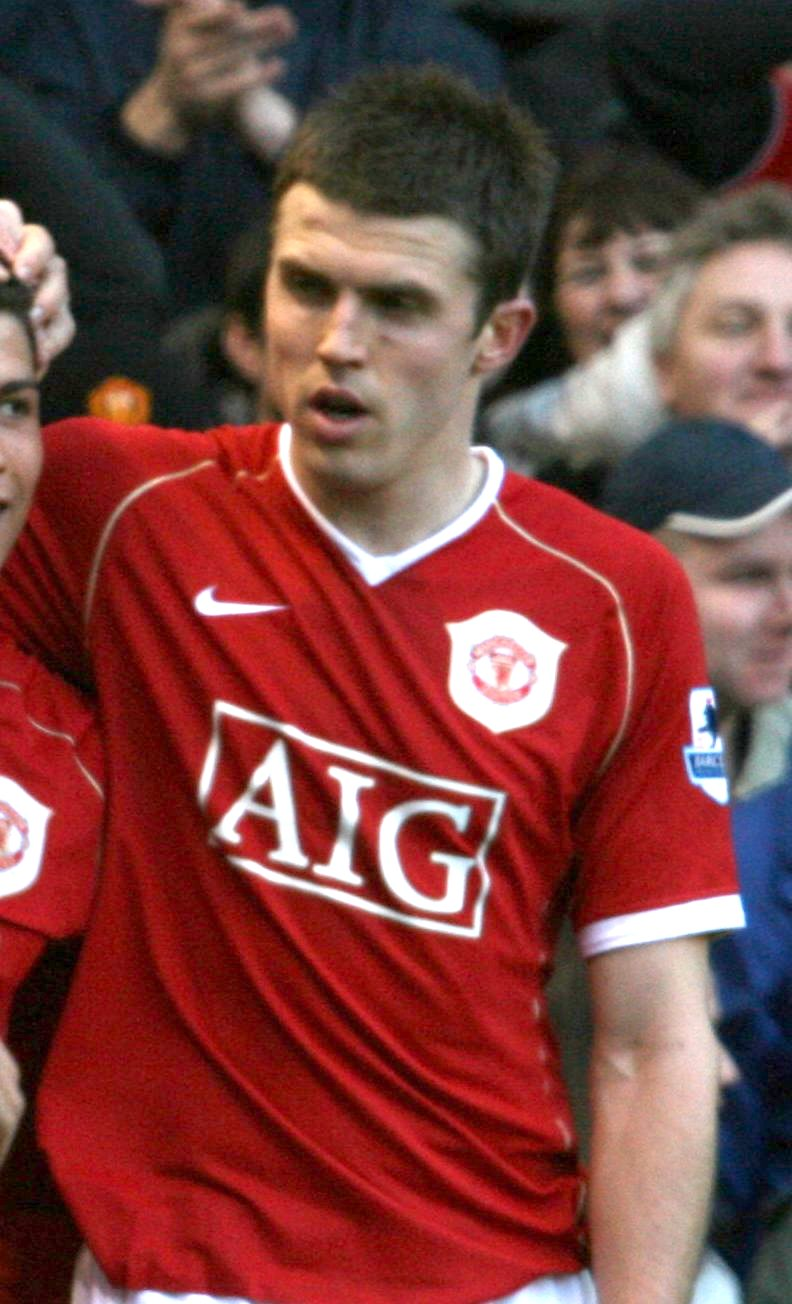
Carrick celebrates a goal with Cristiano Ronaldo (left) in the Manchester derby in a 3–1 home win in 2006.

On 10 June, Tottenham revealed they had rejected a bid from Manchester United for Carrick, who was seen by their manager Alex Ferguson as a replacement for the departed Roy Keane, the former club captain. The following day, Tottenham manager Martin Jol insisted Carrick would be staying with the club, stating "I don't want to lose a player like Michael, who was probably our best midfielder last season". On 28 July, Tottenham announced that the clubs agreed a deal for the transfer of Carrick to Manchester United. Three days later, the transfer was official as personal terms were agreed with Carrick. Despite agreeing a deal for the player the previous week, the fee was not made public until Spurs issued a statement to the stock exchange. Manchester United's chief executive David Gill confirmed the transfer fee as £14 million, potentially rising to £18.6 million, which would make Carrick the sixth most expensive player acquired by Manchester United at the time. He was given the number 16 shirt, previously worn by Keane.

Carrick made his debut for the club on 4 August 2006 in a 3–1 pre-season friendly win over Porto in the Amsterdam Tournament. The following day, Carrick was forced to miss the start of the 2006–07 season as a result of injuring his foot during the final tournament match against Ajax. Following his recovery from this injury he made his competitive debut on 23 August in a 3–0 away league win over Charlton Athletic. Three days later, he made his first start for the club in a 2–1 win away over Watford. Towards the end of December he missed two games as he suffered a minor injury. He returned in time to feature in United's final game of 2006, a 3–2 home win over Reading on 30 December. On 13 January 2007, Carrick scored his first Manchester United goal in a 3–1 win at home over Aston Villa. One month later, he scored his first ever FA Cup goal in a 1–1 draw at home to Reading on 17 February. He followed this up by contributing one of United's goals in a 4–1 home win over Blackburn Rovers on 31 March. Carrick scored his first-ever Champions League goals on 10 April, scoring twice in a 7–1 home win over Roma in their quarter-final second leg tie. They would go on to lose their semi-final tie 5–3 on aggregate to eventual winners AC Milan, ending their hopes of an all English final against arch-rivals Liverpool. He scored his final goal of the season in a 2–0 win at home over Sheffield United on 17 April. His first season with Manchester United ended in success, as they won the Premier League title as a result of Chelsea's 1–1 draw with Arsenal on 6 May.

Carrick suffered an injury setback in October 2007 after breaking his elbow in a 1–0 home win over Roma in the Champions League group stage. As a result of the injury he would be out of action for up to six weeks. His return to action came on 3 November as a substitute for Anderson in a 2–2 draw at Arsenal. Carrick scored his first goal of the season on 10 February 2008 in the Manchester derby, his goal came in injury time and was mere consolation in a 2–1 home loss to rivals Manchester City. His second and final goal of the season came against his former club West Ham United in a 4–1 win at home on 3 May. Although he scored just two league goals that season it still led to another league title as United beat Wigan Athletic on the final day of the season to prevent Chelsea from reaching the top spot. On 18 April, one week on from their title success Carrick was offered a new five-year contract along with defenders Rio Ferdinand and Wes Brown. A four-year contract was then signed on 17 May 2008, which tied Carrick to United until at least June 2012. He participated in his first-ever Champions League final on 21 May in Moscow, playing the full 120 minutes in a 6–5 penalty shootout win over Chelsea in the 2008 final. The scoreline ended 1–1 after extra time, he took United's second penalty of the subsequent shootout, which he converted to help give him the first European honour of his career.

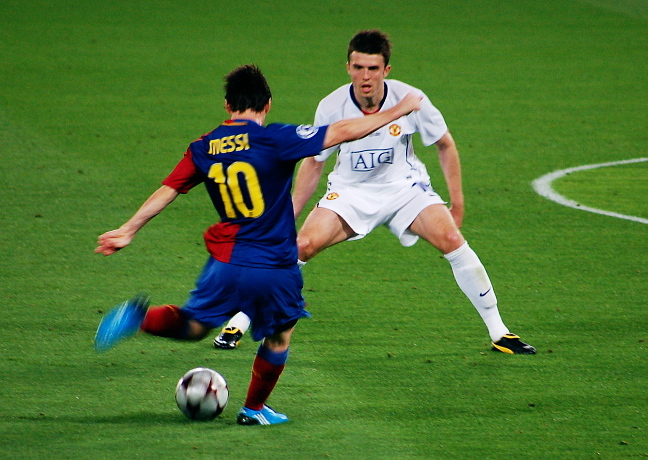
Carrick (back) defending a shot from Lionel Messi in the 2009 UEFA Champions League final

During United's first league game of the 2008–09 season at home to Newcastle United, Carrick was substituted after just 25 minutes as a result of an injured ankle in the 1–1 draw. The following day, it was confirmed he would be out for up to three weeks, which ruled him out of the UEFA Super Cup match against Zenit St. Petersburg on 29 August. His return to action came on 13 September in a 2–1 away loss to Liverpool, he was taken off at half-time during after sustaining another injury. Three days later, it was revealed he would be out for up to six weeks after breaking a bone in his foot during a challenge with Yossi Benayoun. On 1 November, Carrick scored his first goal of the season in a 4–3 home win over Hull City. His second goal followed two weeks later in a 5–0 home win over Stoke City. His first goal of 2009 came on 22 April as he scored late on in a 2–0 home win over Portsmouth. On 13 May, he assisted Carlos Tevez and then scored a late winner in a 2–1 win away to Wigan. The goal was Carrick's first for United away from home and meant that they only needed one point from their final two games to gain a third successive Premier League title. Carrick ensured a third title in three years with United as they drew with Arsenal 0–0 at home on 18 May to claim an 18th overall English title. On 27 May, Carrick played the full match in the 2009 Champions League final in a 2–0 defeat by Barcelona. This defeat was described by Carrick as worst night of his career as he said "the game just seemed to pass us by and we were unable to do anything about it. I suppose when you look at the big picture, it was still another Champions League final".

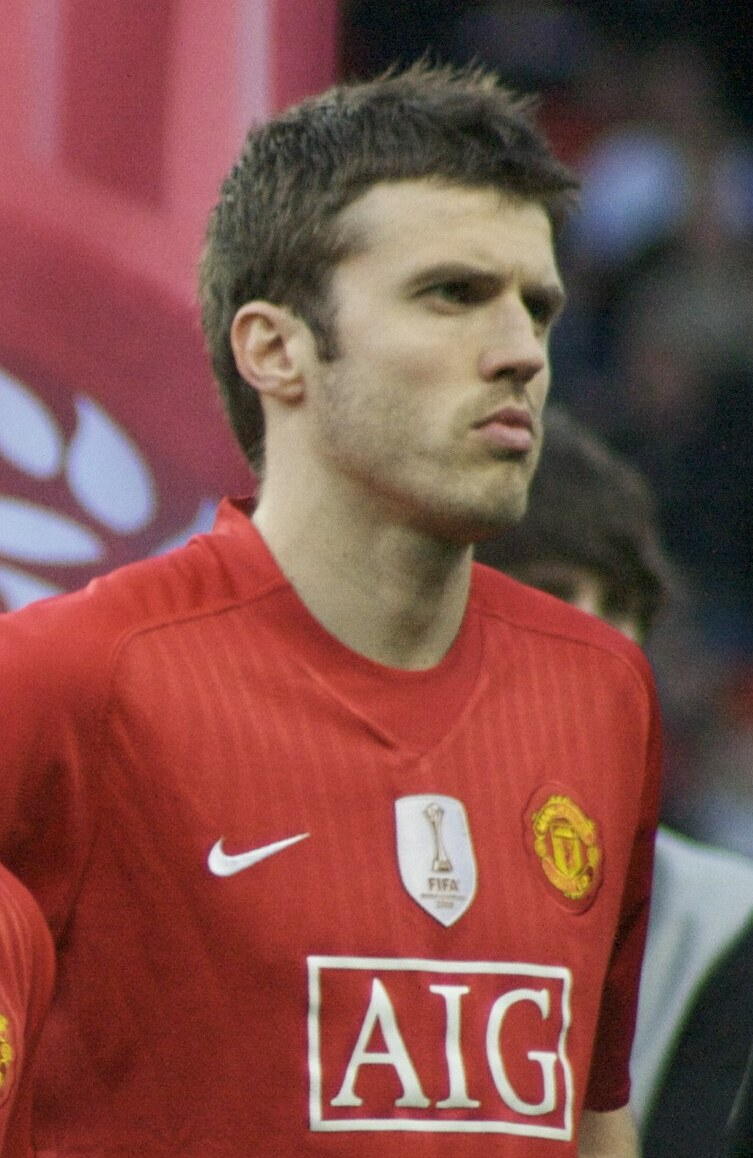
Carrick with Manchester United in 2009

On 30 September, Carrick scored his first goal of the 2009–10 season with the decisive goal against German champions Wolfsburg in a 2–1 Champions League win at home. Two months later, he scored his first league goal of the season, scoring the second of a 3–0 home win over Everton. Due to a defensive crisis during December, Carrick had to fill in at centre-back since Gary Neville, himself being played out of position, picked up an injury against West Ham United in a 4–0 away win. Carrick had never previously played in defence during his career but manager Alex Ferguson was very pleased with his contribution. On 8 December, he played in defence again by playing in a three-man defence alongside central-midfielder Darren Fletcher and regular left-back Patrice Evra in a 3–1 away win against Wolfsburg in the Champions League. His third goal of the season came on 30 December in a 5–0 home league win over Wigan Athletic in what was United's last game of the decade.

==== 2010–2013: Continued success ====
On 25 January 2010, Carrick scored the first-ever League Cup goal of his career in a 4–3 aggregate win over rivals Manchester City in the second leg of their semi-final tie. On 6 February, Carrick scored in a 5–0 home win over Portsmouth but it was credited as a Richard Hughes own goal following the game. However, the Dubious Goals Panel officially awarded Carrick the goal on 25 May following a review. On 16 February 2010, he was sent off for the first time in his career after seeing two yellow cards in United's 3–2 win over A.C. Milan at the San Siro. The midfielder was shown a second yellow card in injury-time after flicking the ball away following Patrice Evra's foul on Alexandre Pato. Carrick played the entire game of the 2010 League Cup final against Aston Villa, which United won 2–1 resulting in his first League Cup medal. This was the first season of his United career that would end without winning the league title as Chelsea claimed the crown by a single point on the final day of the season.

On 6 August 2010, it was announced that Carrick would miss the start of the 2010–11 season as a result of an ankle injury sustained in United's final pre-season game against a League of Ireland XI. However, two days later, he played 79 minutes of United's 3–1 victory over Chelsea in the 2010 Community Shield. Manager Alex Ferguson claimed, "He came in yesterday, says he was fit, wanted to train, trained, and wanted to play." On 3 March 2011, he signed a new three-year deal keeping him at the club until the end of the 2013–14 season. Carrick's first significant display of the season came in a 1–0 away win over Chelsea in the Champions League on 6 April. He played a vital pass in the move that led to Wayne Rooney's goal and was praised for his performance. However a few days later in the FA Cup semi-final against Manchester City Carrick gave the ball away which led to the only goal of the game scored by Yaya Touré.

At the start of the 2011–12 season, Carrick for the second season in a row was a shock starter at Wembley for the 2011 FA Community Shield. After initially being ruled out through injury by Alex Ferguson in the pre-match build-up, Carrick was named in the starting 11 for the game on 7 August 2011. In the first half, United fell behind to a Joleon Lescott header and a long range Edin Džeko strike to trail 2–0 at half time. Carrick was then substituted at the interval and replaced by youngster Tom Cleverley. However United went on to turn the game around and prevail 3–2 winners. The day after the Shield match, Carrick pulled out of England's friendly match against the Netherlands to rest a niggling injury. He was replaced in the squad by Cleverley. On 18 December, Carrick scored his first goal for United for 70 games when he advanced from his own half of the pitch after cutting out Joey Barton's square ball, past a couple of defenders and firing low past the keeper. He eventually won the Man of the Match award. On 4 January 2012, Carrick played his 250th match for Manchester United in all competitions in a 3–0 away defeat to Newcastle United. He celebrated his Jubilee in a 3–2 away victory against Manchester City at the Etihad Stadium in the FA Cup third round. On 14 January 2012, Carrick scored for United in a 3–0 home win against Bolton. In the 83rd minute, Carrick notched his first goal at Old Trafford since January 2010. He curled a left-footed effort past Ádám Bogdán into the bottom corner. On 16 February 2012, in a Europa League 2–0 away win against Ajax at the Amsterdam Arena, Carrick played his 500th match in all competitions. Carrick also showed his class when he thundered a shot from 30 yards against the post in a 2–0 win against Queens Park Rangers on 8 April.

As a result of a defensive injury crisis at the club, Carrick started the 2012–13 season as a makeshift centre-back. His inexperience in the role was exploited by Everton in the season opener, as Marouane Fellaini beat him to a corner kick to score the only goal of the game. He continued in the role for the next match against Fulham. He scored his first goal of the season in a 1–0 Champions League victory against Galatasaray, after series of ball movement leading to Michael Carrick rounding the goalkeeper to score with his left foot. On 24 November 2012, Carrick was left out the squad that defeated QPR 3–1, ending his run of 33 consecutive league starts. April 2013 saw Carrick nominated for the PFA Player of the Year Award for his performances during the season with Manchester United. Arsenal manager Arsène Wenger said Carrick would be his personal choice for the award, "He is a quality passer. He could play for Barcelona, he would be perfectly suited to their game. He has a good vision and is an intelligent player." Tottenham winger Gareth Bale was ultimately voted as the winner; Carrick was, however, included in the PFA Team of the Year for the 2012–13 season. Carrick went on to be announced as Manchester United's Players' Player of the Year for the 2012–13 season.

On 22 November 2013, Manchester United announced that Carrick had signed a contract extension until 2015, with the option to extend for a further year. In the 2013–14 season, Carrick struggled to retain his previous season's form, as Manchester United struggled generally under new manager David Moyes. His season was not helped by a persistent achilles problem that kept him out from November until December, whilst new signings in midfield such as Marouane Fellaini had failed to perform.

==== 2014–2018: Final years ====
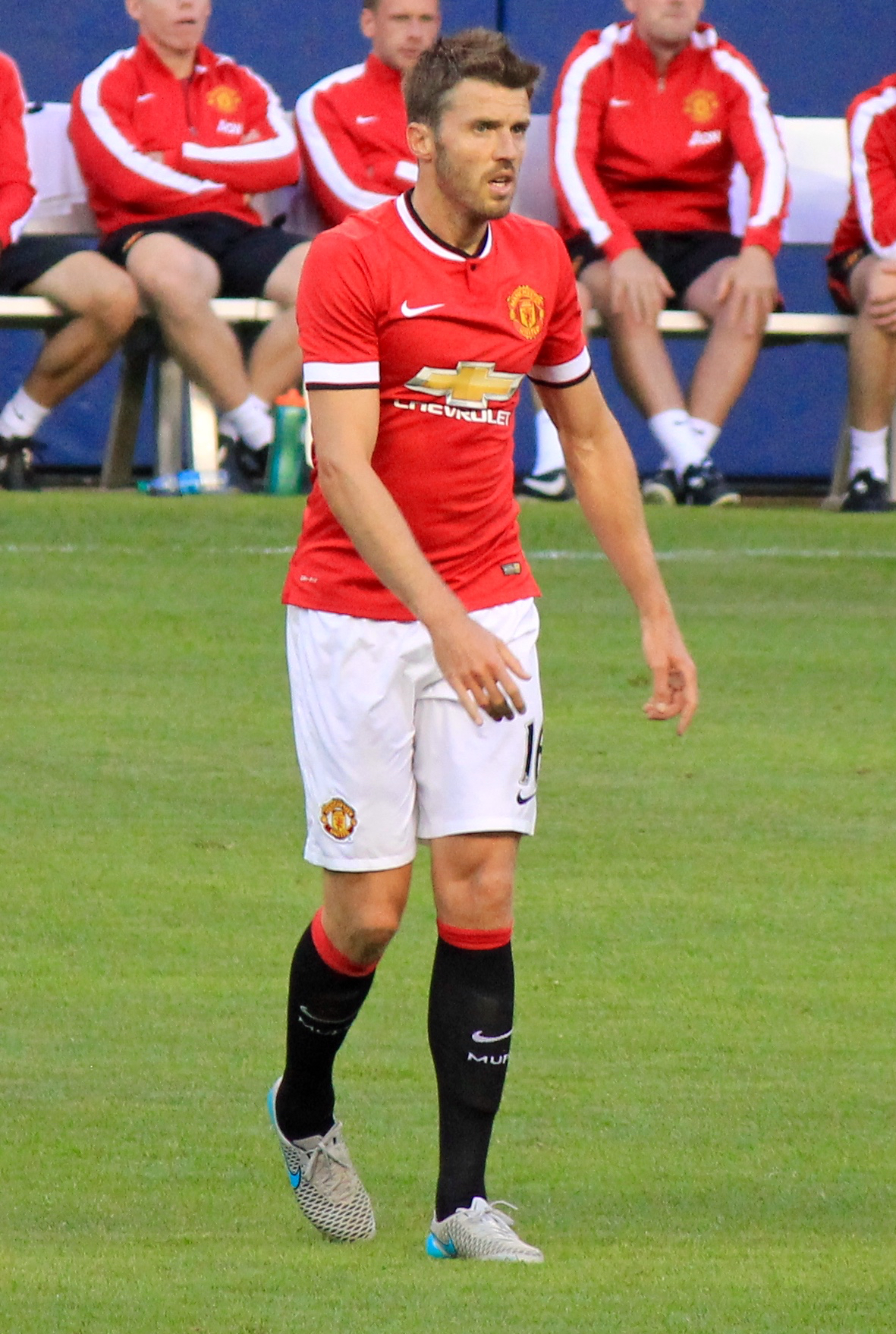
Carrick playing in a pre-season friendly in 2015

In February 2014, Carrick was criticised by former club captain Roy Keane for what Keane thought was a poor interview. Although Carrick made a total of 42 appearances in all competitions that season, there was speculation over whether Carrick had a future at Manchester United. In July, Carrick suffered an injury during a pre-season training session that was expected to keep him out for 12 weeks. Carrick's first game back from injury came at the 1–0 defeat against Manchester City on 2 November 2014, where he came on as a replacement centre-back following Chris Smalling's dismissal. After Marcos Rojo suffered a dislocated shoulder in the same match, Carrick stated that he would be happy to play as a makeshift centre-back. After Carrick returned to the starting line-up on a regular basis, Match of the Day 2 pundit Dietmar Hamann attributed some of Manchester United's improved form to Carrick's return in December, after the club had won all of the six games that he had started.

Alex Ferguson stated that he thought Carrick was the best English player in an interview with BT Sport in December 2014, shortly after Carrick had been named as Manchester United's new vice-captain by Louis van Gaal. On 15 March 2015, he provided an assist for Marouane Fellaini's goal, and scored his first goal in more than a year during a 3–0 victory against his former club Tottenham Hotspur. Five days later, Carrick signed a new one-year extension to his contract, lengthening his Manchester United career to 10 seasons. Carrick made his 400th Manchester United appearance on 2 January 2016 in the 2–1 home win over Swansea City, coming on as a stoppage-time substitute. On 21 May, he played the full 120 minutes in United's FA Cup win as United beat Crystal Palace 2–1 after extra time. This victory completed his collection of every domestic honour in the English game. He signed a new one-year contract extension on 9 June 2016.

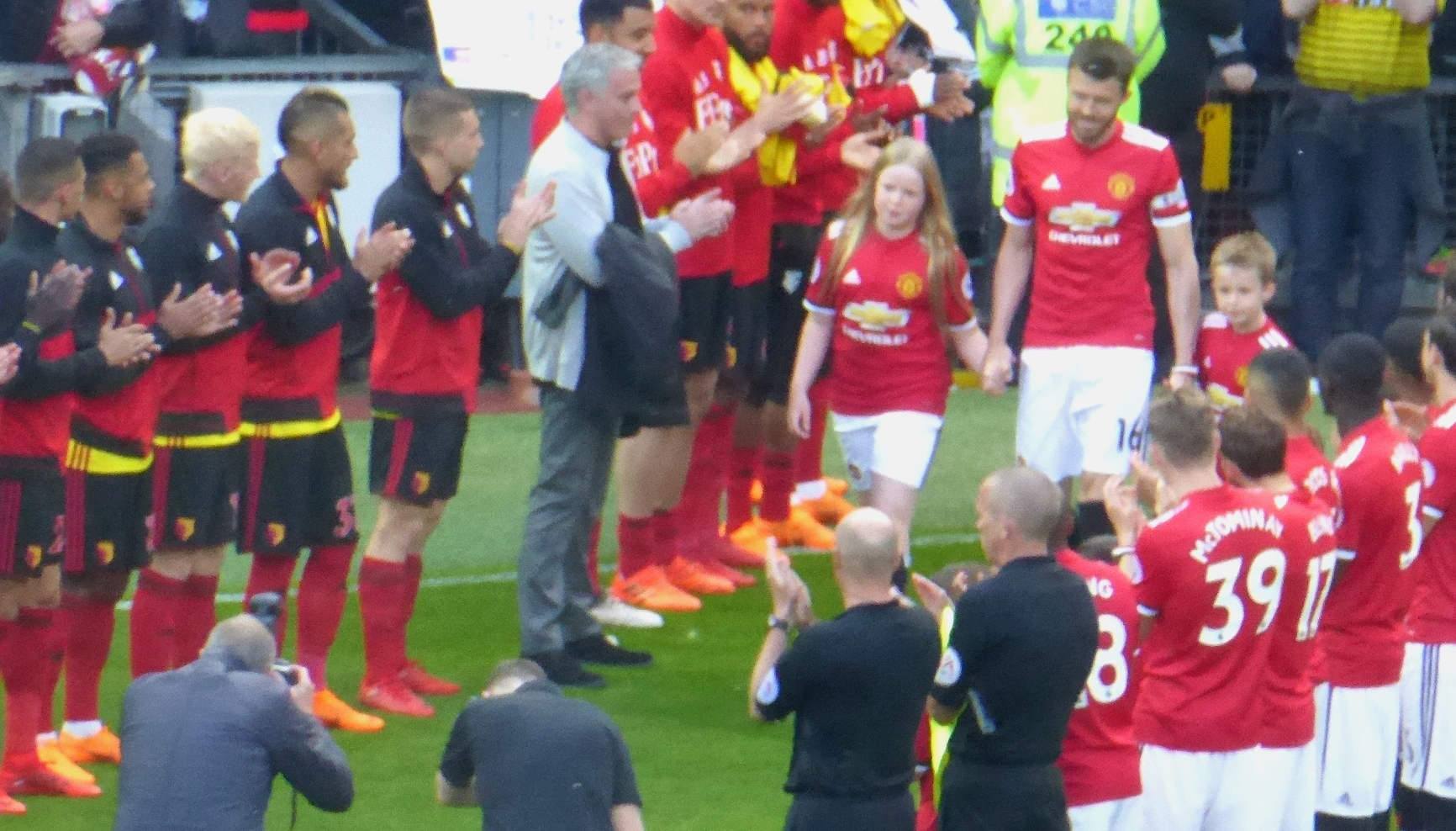
Carrick receiving a guard of honour at Old Trafford before his final match in 2018

Carrick scored his first goal of the 2016–17 season on 21 September with United's first in a 3–1 away victory over Northampton Town in the third round of the EFL Cup. Carrick became a key member of José Mourinho's team and his performances were highly recognised for his ability to control play, instil calmness and pass accurately. Mourinho also claimed that he wished Carrick was 10 years younger. In May 2017, Carrick extended his contract until June 2018. Eleven years of service to the club resulted in Carrick being granted a testimonial at the end of the 2016–17 season. Played at Old Trafford on 4 June 2017, the match was contested by a team representing Manchester United's 2008 Champions League-winning side and a team of all-stars selected by Carrick himself, managed by Alex Ferguson and Harry Redknapp respectively. The match ended in a 2–2 draw with Carrick scoring from a 25-yard strike. The money raised from the game was distributed to Carrick's chosen charities. Following the departure of club captain Wayne Rooney from Manchester United in July 2017, Carrick was appointed as Rooney's replacement.

In November 2017, Carrick announced that he had undergone a procedure for an irregular heart rhythm after suffering dizziness during a match and in training. The medical treatment was successful and he returned to United's first-team squad as club captain. In January 2018, Carrick accepted an offer to join the club's first-team coaching staff after his retirement at the end of the 2017–18 season. He made his 464th and final appearance as a player for Manchester United in the last match of the league season against Watford at Old Trafford on 13 May, in which he helped create Marcus Rashford's game-winning goal as his side won 1–0. Carrick was substituted towards the end of the match to allow the fans to give him a standing ovation.

== International career ==
Carrick was capped by the England national under-18 and under-21 teams before receiving his first call-up to the senior team in Sven-Göran Eriksson's first game in charge of England in February 2001. Despite being named in the 31-man squad to face Spain, he was an unused substitute in England's 3–0 victory on 28 February. Three months later he made his England debut, replacing David Beckham as a second-half substitute in a 4–0 friendly win over Mexico. His full debut came during their 2–1 victory over the United States on 28 May 2005. Three days later Carrick started again in a 3–2 victory over Colombia in the final game of their tour of the US.

On 8 May 2006, Eriksson named Carrick in a 23-man provisional squad for the 2006 FIFA World Cup, eventually being named in the final 23-man squad for the tournament in Germany. He was an unused substitute for all three of England's Group B games as they advanced to the knockout stage. Carrick played just one game in the tournament, a 1–0 victory in the second round match against Ecuador on 25 June. The next game he was dropped to the bench for the quarter-final tie against Portugal, with Owen Hargreaves replacing him. The game ended goalless after extra time, Portugal won 3–1 in the subsequent penalty shootout and knocked England out of the World Cup.

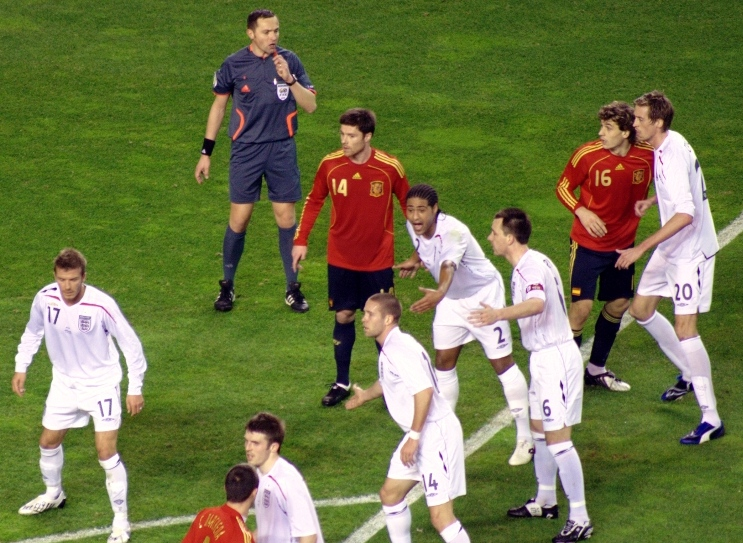
Carrick (bottom) in the 2–0 defeat to Spain in 2009

Carrick had been regularly overlooked by various England managers when it came to the central roles, with Frank Lampard and Steven Gerrard generally being preferred. He started nine games under Sven-Göran Eriksson and his successor Steve McClaren. His last appearance under McClaren was in a 2–1 defeat at home to Germany in August 2007. Newly appointed manager Fabio Capello left Carrick out of his first England squad on 2 February 2008. During Capello's first year in charge of England Carrick was largely overlooked. However, he was named in Capello's squad for the game against the Czech Republic, but was forced to withdraw after sustaining an injury during Manchester United's game with Newcastle United. In November 2008, he returned to the squad for a friendly against Germany in Berlin. Starting alongside Gareth Barry in central midfield in England's 2–1 victory, he was named as Man of the Match by the BBC.

Despite playing just one game during England's 2010 World Cup qualification campaign, he was named in Capello's 30-man preliminary squad for the 2010 World Cup on 11 May 2010. He played 61 minutes of their 3–1 warm-up friendly win over Mexico before being replaced by Tom Huddlestone. On 2 June, Carrick was then named in the final 23-man squad to fly to South Africa for the tournament, before being given the squad number 22. During the World Cup Carrick failed to make it onto the pitch, remaining an unused member of the squad. England were eventually knocked out of the tournament as they lost 4–1 to Germany in their second round tie on 27 June. On 6 August, Alex Ferguson claimed Carrick would be out for two weeks with an ankle injury and would miss England's friendly against Hungary the following Wednesday. Capello left Carrick out of the subsequent England squad only to arrive at Wembley and see him play 79 minutes of the Community Shield match. Capello made a 'call me' sign as Carrick walked past his seat to collect the winner's medal.

In May 2012, England manager Roy Hodgson said he left Carrick out of the 23-man squad and the standby list for UEFA Euro 2012 because he had previously told The Football Association that he did not want to be a bit-part player, although he could help the team "in extremis". On 10 August, Carrick was recalled to the England squad by Hodgson for a friendly match against Italy on 15 August. He played the full 90 minutes in the 2–1 victory over the Azzurri in Switzerland and also took over the captain's armband from Frank Lampard for the final 20 minutes. On 7 September 2012, Carrick came on a half-time substitute in England's 5–0 2014 FIFA World Cup qualifier against Moldova. He then started against San Marino in another 5–0 win the following month. On 17 October 2012, Carrick partnered Steven Gerrard in central midfield in the away qualifier against Poland. On 26 March 2013, the partnership was renewed in England's qualifier against Montenegro in Podgorica. On 15 October 2013, Carrick started in England's final qualifier, a 2–0 home win against Poland, as the team qualified for the 2014 World Cup. In May 2014, Carrick was named on England's standby list for the 2014 FIFA World Cup after being omitted from the main 23-man squad travelling to Brazil.

Having not appeared since 2013, Carrick was named in the squad for the November 2014 matches with Slovenia and Scotland. However, on 12 November, he pulled out of the squad after sustaining a groin injury. On 27 March 2015, Carrick made his first appearance for England in 17 months, starting the 4–0 UEFA Euro 2016 qualifying defeat of Lithuania at Wembley Stadium. On 31 March 2015, Carrick made his 33rd appearance for the national team as a substitute for Manchester United teammate and defender Chris Smalling, performing impressively to help England earn a draw against Italy in an international friendly match. On 14 November 2015, Carrick suffered an ankle injury during a match against Spain and left the pitch on a stretcher. England went on to lose the game 2–0.

== Coaching career ==
=== Manchester United ===
Carrick remained at Manchester United after retirement, having gained a position on José Mourinho's coaching staff, alongside fellow new appointee Kieran McKenna; both were filling the void left by former assistant manager Rui Faria, who opted to begin his own spell in management. Mourinho was dismissed by United on 18 December 2018, following an indifferent first half of the season, resulting in Carrick briefly being named acting caretaker manager, prior to the appointment of another former United player Ole Gunnar Solskjær into that position for the rest of the season. Solskjær retained Carrick as part of his coaching staff, with Solskjær and his coaching staff being appointed on a permanent basis in March 2019.

On 21 November 2021, after Ole Gunnar Solskjær left his role as manager, Carrick was named caretaker manager. Carrick's first match in charge was a UEFA Champions League tie away at Villarreal, which United won following late goals from Cristiano Ronaldo and a first United goal for Jadon Sancho, sealing United's place in the last-16 of the competition. Following a 3–2 victory against Arsenal on 2 December, Carrick stepped down as first team coach and left Manchester United with immediate effect, shortly after the appointment of Ralf Rangnick as interim manager, who would go on to remain in the role for the rest of the season. During Carrick's three match reign as caretaker manager, he recorded two wins and one draw, with United also having drawn with Chelsea in his first Premier League game.

=== Middlesbrough ===
On 24 October 2022, Carrick was appointed head coach of Championship club Middlesbrough. Middlesbrough were 21st in the Championship at the time of his appointment, with 17 points from 16 games played, one point above the relegation zone. Despite taking the lead, Middlesbrough lost Carrick's first game in charge 2–1 away to Preston North End on 29 October. Carrick won 16 of his first 23 Middlesbrough games as the club began to climb the table. On 7 December 2022, Carrick was nominated for the EFL Championship Manager of the Month award for November after his first calendar month in charge. Ten points from four matches, scoring thirteen goals along the way, saw him win the award for March 2023. After guiding his side to a fourth-place finish, Middlesbrough lost in the play-off semi-finals to Coventry City.

In his second season with Middlesbrough, Carrick guided the club to the semi-finals of the EFL Cup for the first time since winning the 2004 final. Middlesbrough won the first leg 1–0 at home against Chelsea, but lost 6–1 in the return fixture. Middlesbrough ended their 2023–24 campaign in eighth position. On 3 June 2024, Carrick signed a new three-year contract.

On 4 June 2025, Carrick was dismissed by Middlesbrough following a tenth-placed finish.

=== Return to Manchester United ===
Carrick returned to Manchester United on 13 January 2026 to take over as head coach until the end of the 2025–26 season. Four days later, on 17 January, he led the team to a 2–0 win over Manchester City in the Manchester derby. It was United's first win over their rivals at Old Trafford since January 2023. He went on to win his second game in charge which was against Arsenal, a 3–2 thriller on 25 January, earning United a 100th win over Arsenal and the club's first away league victory over their rivals since December 2017. After a 3–2 home win against Fulham, he then led the team to a fourth consecutive win, defeating Tottenham Hotspur in United's first win against Spurs since October 2022. The winning streak ended with a 1–1 draw at West Ham United. Under Carrick, United finished the season in third place, qualifying for the 2026–27 UEFA Champions League. Having amassed the most points in the league since his arrival, Carrick was nominated for the Premier League Manager of the Season award.

On 22 May 2026, it was announced that Carrick had signed a new contract to continue as United's head coach through to 2028. However, on 12 November 2026, with the team in the Premier League relegation zone, Carrick was dismissed due to poor performances.

== Player profile ==
=== Style of play ===
"Anti-glamour English midfielder who scored no goals, provided no assists, scarcely made the highlights reel, but still looked the most quietly decisive presence on the pitch."

— Barney Ronay, The Guardian on Carrick (April 2015)

Despite playing as a deep-lying midfielder, Carrick did not rely on pace, stamina, physical attributes, box-to-box play and tackling like a typical ball-winning midfielder; instead, his intelligence, composure and reading of the game helped him to anticipate any attacking threats from the opposition team, most of the time by covering space and making interceptions. According to an analysis by Tifo Football, Carrick relied heavily on constant scanning, turning his head every two seconds to maintain awareness of both teammates and opponents. The analysis highlighted his strong defensive metrics, noting that he committed remarkably few fouls while breaking up play. His distribution of the ball, vision, creativity, playmaking skills, crossing ability, and range of passing, among the best in comparison to other midfielders in Europe, was allied to an ability to dictate the tempo of the game, as well as initiate team attacks.

After his arrival at Manchester United in 2006, Carrick formed an effective partnership with Paul Scholes, with Carrick playing in a holding role and Scholes alongside him as a deep-seated playmaker. This midfield partnership contributed to a change towards a continental playing style embraced by manager Alex Ferguson and assistant Carlos Queiroz, which relied on passing and keeping possession in contrast to the more traditionally direct and all-action style of English football.

=== Reception and image ===
"I am a big fan of Michael Carrick. He's one of the best holding midfielders I've ever seen in my life, by far."

— Manchester City manager Pep Guardiola (2017)

Former manager Alex Ferguson remarked that in his early period at Manchester United, Carrick was "a shy boy who needed to be shaken at times". His unassuming style, however, also led to a lack of attention from successive England national team managers in favour of all-action midfielders such as Frank Lampard and Steven Gerrard. In his autobiography, Ferguson remarked that Carrick "lacked the bravado" of Lampard and Gerrard, adding that he "suffered in the shadow of those two big personalities". Although Carrick has a quiet and reserved personality, he has been described as possessing resilience and determination. Ferguson wrote, "There is a casualness about him that causes people to misunderstand his value and his constitution."

In 2008, Carrick's ability to dictate the tempo from deep led UEFA to describe him as the "metronome" of Manchester United's midfield. Carrick's intelligence and awareness were highlighted by former Manchester United manager Louis van Gaal, who labelled him his "trainer coach during the game". Jonathan Wilson described Carrick as an "invaluable cog" for Manchester United during the van Gaal era, noting his "calming demeanour" provided essential protection to a "jittery back four". Wilson further highlighted Carrick's tactical influence through statistics, pointing out that during the 2014–15 season, the team averaged 2.44 points per game with him in the starting lineup, compared to 1.41 without him. Commenting during that same season, Thierry Henry echoed this sentiment, stating: "Not only this season but every year. People do not realise the amount of work he delivers until he has gone." His importance to the team performance was frequently praised by former teammates Gary Neville and Paul Scholes, as well as European peers Xavi and Xabi Alonso. Additionally, in 2013, Arsenal manager Arsène Wenger backed Carrick for the PFA Players' Player of the Year award, lauding him as "a quality passer" who would be "perfectly suited" to the style of play at Barcelona, further noting that he was an underrated player in England who deserved recognition as one of the "real players at the heart of the game".

Carrick is widely regarded as one of the most underrated and under-appreciated footballers in Premier League and football history. (Note: See) In 2015, The Daily Telegraph included him at number one in their list of "The top 20 most under-rated footballers of all time", describing him as an "unassuming but highly intelligent and technically gifted deep-lying midfielder", who "has consistently performed well".

== Personal life ==
Carrick and Lisa Roughead, a Pilates instructor with a business degree, began dating when they were both at school. They married in Wymondham, Leicestershire, on 16 June 2007, and have a daughter and a son.

In October 2018, Carrick said that he had suffered from depression for two years following the defeat in the 2009 UEFA Champions League final.

His brother Graeme also works in coaching, having held roles at Newcastle United and on Middlesbrough's first‑team staff.

== Career statistics ==
=== Club ===
Appearances and goals by club, season and competition
Club	Season	League			FA Cup		League Cup		Europe		Other		Total	
Club	Season	Division	Apps	Goals	Apps	Goals	Apps	Goals	Apps	Goals	Apps	Goals	Apps	Goals
West Ham United	1999–2000	Premier League	8	1	0	0	0	0	1 (Note: Appearance in UEFA Intertoto Cup)	0	—		9	1
West Ham United	2000–01	Premier League	33	1	4	0	4	0	—		—		41	1
West Ham United	2001–02	Premier League	30	2	1	0	1	0	—		—		32	2
West Ham United	2002–03	Premier League	30	1	2	0	2	0	—		—		34	1
West Ham United	2003–04	First Division	35	1	4	0	1	0	—		3 (Note: Appearances in First Division play-offs)	0	43	1
West Ham United	Total		136	6	11	0	8	0	1	0	3	0	159	6
Swindon Town (loan)	1999–2000	First Division	6	2	0	0	—		—		—		6	2
Birmingham City (loan)	1999–2000	First Division	2	0	—		—		—		—		2	0
Tottenham Hotspur	2004–05	Premier League	29	0	6	0	3	0	—		—		38	0
Tottenham Hotspur	2005–06	Premier League	35	2	1	0	1	0	—		—		37	2
Tottenham Hotspur	Total		64	2	7	0	4	0	—		—		75	2
Manchester United	2006–07	Premier League	33	3	7	1	0	0	12 (Note: Appearances in UEFA Champions League)	2	—		52	6
Manchester United	2007–08	Premier League	31	2	4	0	1	0	12	0	1 (Note: Appearance in FA Community Shield)	0	49	2
Manchester United	2008–09	Premier League	28	4	3	0	1	0	9	0	2 (Note: One appearance in FA Community Shield, one appearance in FIFA Club World Cup)	0	43	4
Manchester United	2009–10	Premier League	30	3	0	0	5	1	8	1	1	0	44	5
Manchester United	2010–11	Premier League	28	0	3	0	1	0	11	0	1	0	44	0
Manchester United	2011–12	Premier League	30	2	2	0	1	0	7 (Note: Four appearances in UEFA Champions League, three appearances in UEFA Europa League)	0	1	0	41	2
Manchester United	2012–13	Premier League	36	1	5	0	0	0	5	1	—		46	2
Manchester United	2013–14	Premier League	29	1	0	0	3	0	7	0	1	0	40	1
Manchester United	2014–15	Premier League	18	1	2	0	0	0	—		—		20	1
Manchester United	2015–16	Premier League	28	0	5	0	1	0	8 (Note: Four appearances in UEFA Champions League, four appearances in UEFA Europa League)	0	—		42	0
Manchester United	2016–17	Premier League	23	0	2	0	5	1	7 (Note: Appearances in UEFA Europa League)	0	1	0	38	1
Manchester United	2017–18	Premier League	2	0	2	0	1	0	0	0	0	0	5	0
Manchester United	Total		316	17	35	1	19	2	86	4	8	0	464	24
Career total			524	27	53	1	31	2	87	4	11	0	706	34

=== International ===
Appearances and goals by national team and year
National team	Year	Apps	Goals
England	2001	2	0
England	2002	0	0
England	2003	0	0
England	2004	0	0
England	2005	2	0
England	2006	7	0
England	2007	3	0
England	2008	1	0
England	2009	5	0
England	2010	2	0
England	2011	0	0
England	2012	4	0
England	2013	5	0
England	2014	0	0
England	2015	3	0
Total		34	0

== Managerial statistics ==
As of match played 8 November 2026

Managerial record by team and tenure
Team	From	To	Record					Ref.
Team	From	To	P	W	D	L	Win %	Ref.
Manchester United (caretaker)	21 November 2021	2 December 2021	3	2	1	0	66.7	
Middlesbrough	24 October 2022	4 June 2025	136	63	24	49	46.3	
Manchester United	13 January 2026	12 November 2026	32	15	8	9	46.9	
Career total			171	80	33	58	46.8	

== Honours ==
=== Player ===
West Ham United U18

- FA Youth Cup: 1998–99

West Ham United

- UEFA Intertoto Cup: 1999

Manchester United

- Premier League: 2006–07, 2007–08, 2008–09, 2010–11, 2012–13
- FA Cup: 2015–16
- Football League/EFL Cup: 2009–10, 2016–17
- FA Community Shield: 2007, 2008, 2010, 2011, 2013, 2016
- UEFA Champions League: 2007–08
- UEFA Europa League: 2016–17
- FIFA Club World Cup: 2008

Individual

- PFA Team of the Year: 2003–04 First Division, 2012–13 Premier League
- Manchester United Players' Player of the Year: 2012–13

=== Manager ===
Individual

- EFL Championship Manager of the Month: March 2023
- Premier League Manager of the Month: January 2026
