= No Surrender (to the IRA) =

Association football chant

"No Surrender (to the IRA)" is a British football chant sung to the tune of the "Oil in My Lamp" hymn which expresses opposition to the Provisional Irish Republican Army. It was commonly sung in UK pubs in the 1970s and 1980s, including by Rangers F.C. supporters, many of whom held strong unionist sentiments. It may have been adopted by English fans who switched to following Scottish football clubs (including Rangers F.C.) during the five-year period that English clubs were banned from competing in UEFA competitions following the 1985 Heysel Stadium disaster. By the 21st century, the song has become controversial in both the UK and Ireland. In 2013, The Football Association of England emailed supporters, asking them to refrain from singing it ahead of a May 2013 game against the Republic of Ireland national football team.

== History ==
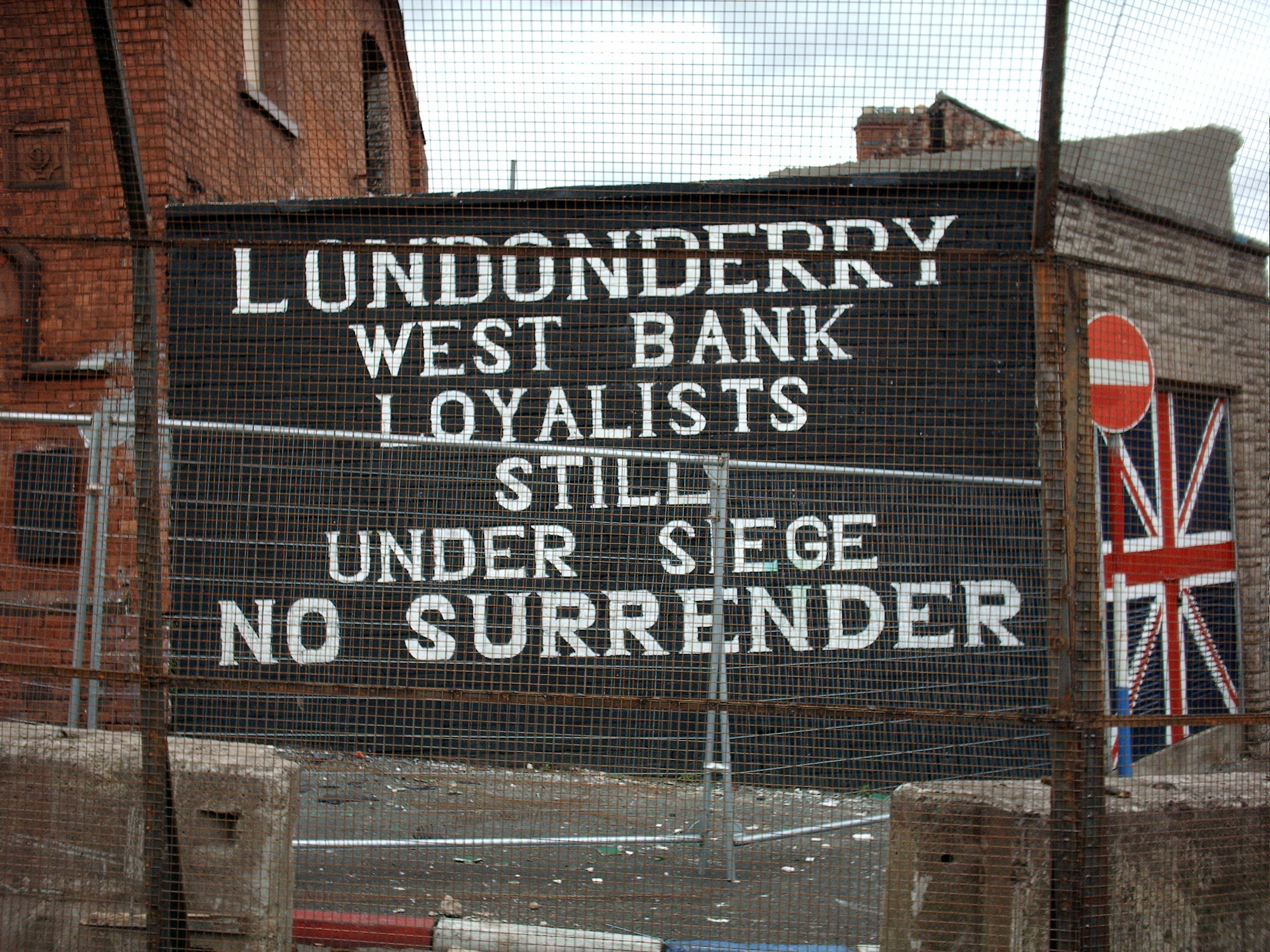
The "No Surrender" slogan on a loyalist mural in Derry, 2004

The "No Surrender" slogan derives from the 1689 Siege of Derry during the Williamite War in Ireland. The song is associated with unionism and particularly Ulster loyalism. It expresses opposition to the Provisional Irish Republican Army (IRA), which carried out hundreds of bombings and killings targeting British security forces and civilians during the Troubles. The origins of the song are unknown but it was chanted in British pubs in the 1970s and 1980s and has been associated with the National Front and the British National Party.

The song came to be sung by Rangers F.C. supporters, many of whom have strong unionist beliefs, in contrast with the pro-Irish republican sentiments of many supporters of Celtic F.C., their Old Firm rivals. The song may have been popularised among English football fans after the Heysel Stadium disaster in Brussels in 1985, which resulted in a five-year ban on English clubs competing in UEFA competitions. Some English fans chose to follow Scottish clubs instead and Rangers, one of the more successful, attracted a sizeable English following.

The chant is not taken up by all supporters but has become associated with English fans in the late 20th and the 21st century, being particularly noticeable at away matches. A 2013 BBC report said that the chanting seemed to originate within sections occupied by members of the official supporter's club. The chant's popularity has lasted long after the 1998 Good Friday Agreement ended the Troubles. The chant has also been used by members of the English Defence League and, since the war on terror began in 2001, has been modified in some cases to refer to al-Qaeda and the Taliban instead of the IRA. Other variants have referred to the eurozone crisis with "IRA" being replaced with "IMF" (International Monetary Fund), "EU" (European Union) or "ECB" (European Central Bank).

While some fans consider the song controversial, sectarian and associated with the far-right and refuse to sing the chant, others consider it only as an anti-terrorist statement and continue to sing the chant. It is not a criminal offence to sing "No Surrender" but in some circumstances it could be considered by some people to contravene article three of FIFA's statutes: "Discrimination of any kind against a country, private person or group of people on account of ethnic origin, gender, language, religion, politics or any other reason is strictly prohibited and punishable by suspension or expulsion".

In addition to the song some fans insert a shout of "no surrender" into the musical bridge before the line "send him victorious" in God Save the King. The Football Association (FA) has, on a number of occasions, attempted to drown this out by increasing the volume of the music.

== Recent history ==
In May 2013 England faced the Republic of Ireland for the first time since the February 1995 friendly which had descended into the Lansdowne Road football riot after just 27 minutes. Hoping to avoid any provocations the FA sent an email to attendees, signed by England manager Roy Hodgson, asking them to refrain from singing "No Surrender". England fans accused the FA of increasing the risk of unrest by drawing attention to the song. A supporters' club spokesman said: "The FA have never made an issue of it in the past but they have made no attempt to explain why it's so offensive. I've never understood why some fans chant that because you don't go to England games to talk about political debate – and a lot of the people who chant it weren't even born when the IRA carried out their bombings on mainland Britain." The song was sung during that match.

The issue was brought to the fore again ahead of the November 2014 match against Scotland at Celtic Park, Glasgow. Given the host ground the FA was mindful of causing unrest and again requested that the song not be sung. This time it was not, but the fans instead chanted "fuck the IRA" in time with the drums of the supporters' band for ten minutes at a time. At half time in the match an FA representative requested that the drummers stop playing. In recent years the song has continued to be sung by England supporters including at the June 2019 UEFA Nations League Finals in Portugal and during unrest in Prague 2019 associated with a UEFA Euro 2020 qualifying match.

== Lyrics ==
The song is sung to the tune of the hymn "Oil in My Lamp" (also known as "Give Me Joy in My Heart").

Verse:
With St George in my heart,
Keep me English,
With St George in my heart I pray,
With St George in my heart,
Keep me English,
Keep me English
Till my dying day.

Chorus:
No surrender,
No surrender,
No surrender to the IRA. Scum.
