= Lansdowne Road football riot =

Riot in Dublin, Ireland by English (1995)

Coordinates: 53°20′6.02″N 6°13′45.13″W

- Match programme
Republic of Ireland	England
(Republic of Ireland)	(England)
–	–
- Match abandoned in the 27th minute with the score Ireland 1–0 England
- Date: 15 February 1995
- Venue: Lansdowne Road, Dublin
- Referee: Dick Jol (Netherlands)

The Lansdowne Road football riot occurred during a friendly football match between the Republic of Ireland and England in Lansdowne Road Stadium in Dublin, Ireland on 15 February 1995. Factions of England fans became extremely unruly, as well as violent, and ended up forcing the match to be abandoned.

== Match ==
The last time England had played Ireland at Lansdowne Road was a UEFA Euro 1992 qualifying Group 7 match on 14 November 1990. After that match, there were clashes between some Irish and English fans and the Gardaí on O'Connell Street in Dublin. Before the 1995 friendly match, the Football Association of Ireland (FAI) held talks with the Football Association (FA) to review security arrangements to avoid a similar episode. The FA was offered 4,000 out of approximately 40,000 tickets, for English fans.

In pubs near Lansdowne Road stadium some English fans chanted "No surrender to the IRA", "Fuck the Pope" and "Clegg is innocent". Irish fans were goaded, spat on and attacked. Pub staff found British National Party literature left behind and in some cases pro-Loyalist graffiti in toilets.

The match began at 6:15 p.m., and after 22 minutes, David Kelly scored a goal for Ireland. When a David Platt goal was disallowed for England in the 26th minute due to Platt being offside, some of the English fans began throwing debris down into the lower stands, including parts of benches which they had ripped out earlier in the match. When this happened, the referee immediately stopped the game, and brought the players off the pitch. When Jack Charlton, the Irish manager and former England player, walked off the pitch, the mob shouted "Judas, Judas". The fans in the lower stands then spilled out onto the pitch to escape the missiles from the English fans. Some Irish fans had mistakenly been put into the area where the English fans were when the FA returned a number of tickets to the FAI.

=== Details ===
15 February 1995
18:15

Republic of Ireland	1–0 Match abandoned, result annulled	England
David Kelly 22'	Report

Lansdowne Road, Dublin
Referee: Dick Jol (Netherlands)

Rep. Ireland
England

GK	1	Alan Kelly Jr.
DF	2	Denis Irwin
DF	4	Alan Kernaghan
DF	5	Paul McGrath
DF	3	Terry Phelan
MF	6	Eddie McGoldrick
MF	7	Andy Townsend
MF	10	John Sheridan
MF	11	Steve Staunton
FW	8	David Kelly
FW	9	Niall Quinn
Manager:
(England) Jack Charlton

GK	1	David Seaman
DF	2	Warren Barton
DF	5	Tony Adams
DF	6	Gary Pallister
DF	3	Graeme Le Saux
MF	11	Darren Anderton
MF	4	Paul Ince
MF	7	David Platt (c)
MF	8	Peter Beardsley
FW	9	Alan Shearer
FW	10	Matt Le Tissier
Manager:
(England) Terry Venables

== Riot ==
After the teams left the pitch, the frequency of missiles intensified, and after 12 minutes, the game was called off, and the fans were evacuated, with the exception of 4,500 English fans, who were kept in the stadium until the Garda Public Order Unit tried to escort them out, at which time more violence broke out. The Gardaí were slow to reach the area where the rioters were, and there was some confusion as to the exact location of the English fans between the Gardaí and the stewards. 20 people were injured during the rioting, and 40 were arrested.

== Reaction ==
The rioting was condemned on both sides of the Irish Sea. England manager Terry Venables said, "It was terrible. I have no words strong enough to describe how we feel about this. There could be repercussions." Jack Charlton said, "I have seen a lot in football but nothing like this. It is a disaster for Irish football but I didn't want the game abandoned because what do you do with 2,000 English fans running around the town? The English fans were being bombarded by some of their own. And they brought out the worst in some of ours." The rioting brought into question England's hosting of Euro 1996, with Ireland's Minister of State for Youth and Sport, Bernard Allen asking, "How can people from Ireland and from other countries go to England and expect to be safe watching matches in the presence of people like those who were here tonight?" The Garda handling of the match was criticised in the press when it was revealed that the Gardaí had been informed of the plans of some of the English fans to cause trouble by the British National Criminal Intelligence Service (NCIS). The decision to seat the English fans in an upper tier was also questioned in the press.

== Investigation ==
After questions were raised about the conduct of the Gardaí, former Chief Justice of Ireland, Thomas Finlay was appointed to investigate the events. He found that the rioting was entirely caused by the English fans without any provocation. The investigation found that the head of the NCIS had offered help to the Gardaí in dealing with the hooligans, an offer which the Gardaí refused. Gardaí failed to act on a warning that 20 supporters of the England team who wore insignia of Combat 18 were travelling to the match. The segregation of the fans was also found to be insufficient, and this was found to be a contributory factor to the incident.

== Future meetings ==
The next meeting between the two sides would not take place until Wednesday 29 May 2013, a friendly at Wembley Stadium, and the next meeting in the Republic of Ireland was on Sunday 7 June 2015 at Dublin's Aviva Stadium. Both games passed without major disturbances.
