= England national football team results (2000–2019) =

- Win Draw Loss

This is a list of the England national football team results from 2000 to 2019 (Matches 765 – 1,001).

== 2000s ==
=== 2000 ===
23 February International Friendly	England	0–0	Argentina	London, England
20:00 GMT (UTC); Match 765		Report		Stadium: Wembley; Attendance: 74,008; Referee: Markus Merk (Germany)

27 May International Friendly	England	1–1	Brazil	London, England
15:00 BST (UTC+01); Match 766	Owen 39'	Report	França 45'	Stadium: Wembley; Attendance: 73,956; Referee: Ryszard Wojcik (Poland)

31 May International Friendly	England	2–0	Ukraine	London, England
20:00 BST (UTC+01); Match 767	Fowler 44'; Adams 68'	Report		Stadium: Wembley; Attendance: 55,975; Referee: Lubos Michel (Slovakia)

3 June International Friendly	Malta	1–2	England	Ta' Qali, Malta
16:00 CEST (UTC+02); Match 768	Carabott 29' (pen.)	Report	Keown 23'; Heskey 75'	Stadium: Ta' Qali National Stadium; Attendance: 10,023; Referee: Stefano Braschi (Italy)

12 June UEFA Euro 2000 Group A	Portugal	3–2	England	Eindhoven, Netherlands
20:45 CEST (UTC+02); Match 769	Figo 22'; Pinto 37'; Nuno Gomes 59'	UEFA Report	Scholes 3'; McManaman 17'	Stadium: PSV Stadion; Attendance: 31,500; Referee: Anders Frisk (Sweden)

17 June UEFA Euro 2000 Group A	England	1–0	Germany	Charleroi, Belgium
20:45 CEST (UTC+02); Match 770	Shearer 53'	UEFA Report		Stadium: Pays de Charleroi; Attendance: 27,700; Referee: Pierluigi Collina (Italy)

20 June UEFA Euro 2000 Group A	England	2–3	Romania	Charleroi, Belgium
20:45 CEST (UTC+02); Match 771	Shearer 41' (pen.); Owen 45+4'	UEFA Report	Chivu 22'; Munteanu 48'; Ganea 89' (pen.)	Stadium: Pays de Charleroi; Attendance: 27,000; Referee: Urs Meier (Switzerland)

2 September International Friendly	France	1–1	England	Paris, France
20:45 CEST (UTC+02); Match 772	Petit 64'	Report	Owen 86'	Stadium: Stade de France; Attendance: 76,318; Referee: Juan Ansuátegui Roca (Spain)

7 October 2002 FIFA World Cup qualification Group 9	England	0–1	Germany	London, England
15:00 BST (UTC+01); Match 773		FIFA Report	Hamann 14'	Stadium: Wembley; Attendance: 76,377; Referee: Stefano Braschi (Italy)

11 October 2002 FIFA World Cup qualification Group 9	Finland	0–0	England	Helsinki, Finland
19:00 EEST (UTC+03); Match 774		FIFA Report		Stadium: Helsinki Olympic Stadium; Attendance: 36,210; Referee: Alain Sars (France)

15 November International Friendly	Italy	1–0	England	Turin, Italy
20:45 CET (UTC+01); Match 775	Gattuso 58'	Report		Stadium: Stadio delle Alpi; Attendance: 22,714; Referee: Sándor Puhl (Hungary)

=== 2001 ===
28 February International Friendly	England	3–0	Spain	Birmingham, England
20:00 GMT (UTC); Match 776	Barmby 38'; Heskey 54'; Ehiogu 70'	Report		Stadium: Villa Park; Attendance: 42,129; Referee: Kyros Vassaras (Greece)

24 March 2002 FIFA World Cup qualification Group 9	England	2–1	Finland	Liverpool, England
15:00 GMT (UTC); Match 777	Owen 44'; Beckham 50'	FIFA Report	Riihilahti 26'	Stadium: Anfield; Attendance: 44,262; Referee: Valentin Ivanov (Russia)

28 March 2002 FIFA World Cup qualification Group 9	Albania	1–3	England	Tirana, Albania
20:30 CEST (UTC+02); Match 778	Rraklli 90+3'	FIFA Report	Owen 73'; Scholes 85'; Andrew Cole 90+6'	Stadium: Qemal Stafa; Attendance: 18,000; Referee: Alain Hamer (Luxembourg)

25 May International Friendly	England	4–0	Mexico	Derby, England
20:00 BST (UTC+01); Match 779	Scholes 3'; Fowler 14'; Beckham 29'; Sheringham 74'	Report		Stadium: Pride Park Stadium; Attendance: 33,597; Referee: Lucillo Cardoso Cortez (Portugal)

6 June 2002 FIFA World Cup qualification Group 9	Greece	0–2	England	Athens, Greece
21:45 EEST (UTC+03); Match 780		FIFA Report	Scholes 64'; Beckham 87'	Stadium: Olympic Stadium; Attendance: 29,300; Referee: Rune Pedersen (Norway)

15 August International Friendly	England	0–2	Netherlands	London, England
20:15 BST (UTC+01); Match 781		Report	Van Bommel 38'; Van Nistelrooy 39'	Stadium: White Hart Lane; Attendance: 35,238; Referee: Anders Frisk (Sweden)

1 September 2002 FIFA World Cup qualification Group 9	Germany	1–5	England	Munich, Germany
19:30 CEST (UTC+02); Match 782	Jancker 6'	FIFA Report	Owen 12', 48', 65'; Gerrard 45+4'; Heskey 73'	Stadium: Olympiastadion; Attendance: 63,000; Referee: Pierluigi Collina (Italy)

5 September 2002 FIFA World Cup qualification Group 9	England	2–0	Albania	Newcastle upon Tyne, England
20:00 BST (UTC+01); Match 783	Owen 43'; Fowler 88'	FIFA Report		Stadium: St James' Park; Attendance: 51,046; Referee: Juan Fernández (Spain)

6 October 2002 FIFA World Cup qualification Group 9	England	2–2	Greece	Manchester, England
15:00 BST (UTC+01); Match 784	Sheringham 68'; Beckham 90+3'	FIFA Report	Charisteas 36'; Nikolaidis 69'	Stadium: Old Trafford; Attendance: 66,000; Referee: Dick Jol (Netherlands)

10 November International Friendly	England	1–1	Sweden	Manchester, England
15:00 GMT (UTC); Match 785	Beckham 28' (pen.)	Report	Mild 44'	Stadium: Old Trafford; Attendance: 64,413; Referee: Claude Colombo (France)

=== 2002 ===
13 February International Friendly	Netherlands	1–1	England	Amsterdam, Netherlands
20:30 CET (UTC+01); Match 786	Kluivert 26'	Report	Vassell 61'	Stadium: Amsterdam Arena; Attendance: 48,500; Referee: Laurent Duhamel (France)

27 March International Friendly	England	1–2	Italy	Leeds, England
20:00 GMT (UTC); Match 787	Fowler 63'	Report	Montella 67', 90+2' (pen.)	Stadium: Elland Road; Attendance: 36,635; Referee: Herbert Fandel (Germany)

17 April International Friendly	England	4–0	Paraguay	Liverpool, England
20:00 BST (UTC+01); Match 788	Owen 4'; Murphy 47'; Vassell 55'; Ayala 78' (o.g.)	Report		Stadium: Anfield; Attendance: 42,713; Referee: Cosimo-Giancarlo Bolognino (Italy)

21 May International Friendly	South Korea	1–1	England	Seogwipo, Korea Republic
19:00 KST (UTC+09); Match 789	Park 52'	Report	Owen 24'	Stadium: Jeju World Cup Stadium; Attendance: 39,876; Referee: Ahmad Khalidi Supian (Malaysia)

26 May International Friendly	Cameroon	2–2	England	Kobe, Japan
15:00 JST (UTC+09); Match 790	Eto'o 5'; Geremi 58'	Report	Vassell 12'; Fowler 90'	Stadium: Wing Stadium; Attendance: 42,000; Referee: Yoshitsugu Katayama (Japan)

2 June 2002 FIFA World Cup Group F	England	1–1	Sweden	Saitama, Japan
18:30 JST (UTC+09); Match 791	Campbell 24'	FIFA Report	Alexandersson 59'	Stadium: Saitama Stadium 2002; Attendance: 52,721; Referee: Carlos Simon (Brazil)

7 June 2002 FIFA World Cup Group F	Argentina	0–1	England	Sapporo, Japan
20:30 JST (UTC+09); Match 792		FIFA Report	Beckham 44' (pen.)	Stadium: Sapporo Dome; Attendance: 35,927; Referee: Pierluigi Collina (Italy)

12 June 2002 FIFA World Cup Group F	Nigeria	0–0	England	Osaka, Japan
15:30 JST (UTC+09); Match 793		FIFA Report		Stadium: Nagai Stadium; Attendance: 44,864; Referee: Brian Hall (United States)

15 June 2002 FIFA World Cup Round of 16	Denmark	0–3	England	Niigata, Japan
20:30 JST (UTC+09); Match 794		FIFA Report	R. Ferdinand 5'; Owen 22'; Heskey 44'	Stadium: Stadium Big Swan; Attendance: 40,582; Referee: Markus Merk (Germany)

21 June 2002 FIFA World Cup Quarter-final	England	1–2	Brazil	Shizuoka, Japan
15:30 JST (UTC+09); Match 795	Owen 23'	FIFA Report	Rivaldo 45+2'; Ronaldinho 50', (red card) 57'	Stadium: Stadium Ecopa; Attendance: 47,436; Referee: Felipe Ramos (Mexico)

7 September International Friendly	England	1–1	Portugal	Birmingham, England
16:00 BST (UTC+01); Match 796	Smith 40'	Report	Costinha 79'	Stadium: Villa Park; Attendance: 40,058; Referee: Tom Henning Øvrebø (Norway)

12 October UEFA Euro 2004 qualifying Group 7	Slovakia	1–2	England	Bratislava, Slovakia
19:30 CEST (UTC+02); Match 797	Németh 23'	UEFA Report	Beckham 64'; Owen 82'	Stadium: Tehelné pole Attendance: 30,000; Referee: Domenico Messina (Italy)

16 October UEFA Euro 2004 qualifying Group 7	England	2–2	Macedonia	Southampton, England
20:00 BST (UTC+01); Match 798	Beckham 14'; Gerrard 36'; Smith (red card) 90+3'	UEFA Report	Šakiri 10'; Trajanov 24'	Stadium: St Mary's Stadium; Attendance: 32,095; Referee: Arturo Dauden Ibañez (Spain)

=== 2003 ===
12 February International Friendly	England	1–3	Australia	London, England
20:00 GMT (UTC); Match 799	Jeffers 70'	Report	Popovic 17'; Kewell 42'; Emerton 84'	Stadium: Boleyn Ground; Attendance: 34,590; Referee: Mejuto González (Spain)

29 March UEFA Euro 2004 qualifying Group 7	Liechtenstein	0–2	England	Vaduz, Liechtenstein
18:30 CET (UTC+01); Match 800		UEFA Report	Owen 28'; Beckham 53'	Stadium: Rheinpark Stadion; Attendance: 3,548; Referee: Georgios Kasnaferis (Greece)

2 April UEFA Euro 2004 qualifying Group 7	England	2–0	Turkey	Sunderland, England
20:00 BST (UTC+01); Match 801	Vassell 75'; Beckham 90+2' (pen.)	UEFA Report		Stadium: Stadium of Light; Attendance: 47,667; Referee: Urs Meier (Switzerland)

22 May International Friendly	South Africa	1–2	England	Durban, South Africa
19:30 SAST (UTC+02); Match 802	McCarthy 18' (pen.)	Report	Southgate 1'; Heskey 64'	Stadium: Kings Park Stadium; Attendance: 48,000; Referee: Lim Kee Chong (Mauritius)

3 June International Friendly	England	2–1	Serbia and Montenegro	Leicester, England
20:00 BST (UTC+01); Match 803	Gerrard 35'; J. Cole 82'	Report	Jestrović 45'	Stadium: Walkers Stadium; Attendance: 30,900; Referee: Paul Allaerts (Belgium)

11 June UEFA Euro 2004 qualifying Group 7	England	2–1	Slovakia	Middlesbrough, England
20:00 BST (UTC+01); Match 804	Owen 62' (pen.), 73'		Janočko 31'	Stadium: Riverside Stadium; Attendance: 35,000; Referee: Wolfgang Stark (Germany)

20 August International Friendly	England	3–1	Croatia	Ipswich, England
20:00 BST (UTC+01); Match 805	Beckham 9' (pen.); Owen 51'; Lampard 80'	Report	Mornar 77'	Stadium: Portman Road; Attendance: 28,700; Referee: Claus Bo Larsen (Denmark)

6 September UEFA Euro 2004 qualifying Group 7	Macedonia	1–2	England	Skopje, Macedonia
18:30 CEST (UTC+02); Match 806	Hristov 27'		Rooney 53'; Beckham 63' (pen.)	Stadium: Skopje City Stadium; Attendance: 20,500; Referee: Frank de Bleeckere (Belgium)

10 September UEFA Euro 2004 qualifying Group 7	England	2–0	Liechtenstein	Manchester, England
20:00 BST (UTC+01); Match 807	Owen 46'; Rooney 51'			Stadium: Old Trafford; Attendance: 64,931; Referee: Knud Erik Fisker (Denmark)

11 October UEFA Euro 2004 qualifying Group 7	Turkey	0–0	England	Istanbul, Turkey
20:00 EEST (UTC+03); Match 808		UEFA Report		Stadium: Şükrü Saracoğlu Stadium; Attendance: 45,000; Referee: Pierluigi Collina (Italy)

16 November International Friendly	England	2–3	Denmark	Manchester, England
16:00 GMT (UTC); Match 809	Rooney 5'; J. Cole 9'	Report	Jørgensen 7', 29'; Dahl Tomasson 82'	Stadium: Old Trafford; Attendance: 64,159; Referee: Vladimar Hrinak (Slovakia)

=== 2004 ===
18 February International Friendly	Portugal	1–1	England	Faro, Portugal
21:20 WET (UTC); Match 810	Pauleta 70'	Report	King 47'	Stadium: Estádio Algarve; Attendance: 27,000; Referee: Victor Kassai (Hungary)

31 March International Friendly	Sweden	1–0	England	Gothenburg, Sweden
20:45 CEST (UTC+02); Match 811	Ibrahimović 54'	Report		Stadium: Ullevi; Attendance: 40,464; Referee: Tom Henning Øvrebø (Norway)

1 June FA Summer Tournament	England	1–1	Japan	Manchester, England
20:00 BST (UTC+01); Match 812	Owen 22'	Report	Ono 53'	Stadium: City of Manchester Stadium; Attendance: 38,581; Referee: Roberto Rosetti (Italy)

5 June FA Summer Tournament	England	6–1	Iceland	Manchester, England
15:30 BST (UTC+01); Match 813	Lampard 25'; Rooney 27', 38'; Vassell 57', 77'; Bridge 68'	Report	Helguson 42'	Stadium: City of Manchester Stadium; Attendance: 43,500; Referee: Jan Wegereef (Netherlands)

13 June UEFA Euro 2004 Group B	France	2–1	England	Lisbon, Portugal
19:45 WEST (UTC+01); Match 814	Zidane 90+1', 90+3' (pen.)	UEFA Report	Lampard 38'	Stadium: Estádio da Luz; Attendance: 62,487; Referee: Markus Merk (Germany)

17 June UEFA Euro 2004 Group B	England	3–0	Switzerland	Coimbra, Portugal
17:00 WEST (UTC+01); Match 815	Rooney 23', 75'; Gerrard 82'	UEFA Report	Haas (red card) 60'	Stadium: Estádio Cidade de Coimbra; Attendance: 28,214; Referee: Valentin Ivanov (Russia)

21 June UEFA Euro 2004 Group B	Croatia	2–4	England	Lisbon, Portugal
19:45 WEST (UTC+01); Match 816	N. Kovač 5'; Tudor 73'	UEFA Report	Scholes 40'; Rooney 45+1', 68'; Lampard 79'	Stadium: Estádio da Luz; Attendance: 57,047; Referee: Pierluigi Collina (Italy)

24 June UEFA Euro 2004 Quarter-final	Portugal	2–2 (a.e.t.) (6–5 p)	England	Lisbon, Portugal
19:45 WEST (UTC+01); Match 817	Postiga 83'; Rui Costa 110'	UEFA Report	Owen 3'; Lampard 115'	Stadium: Estádio da Luz; Attendance: 65,564; Referee: Urs Meier (Switzerland)
	Penalties
	Deco (penalty scored); Simão (penalty scored); R. Costa (penalty missed); Ronaldo (penalty scored); Maniche (penalty scored); Postiga (penalty scored); Ricardo (penalty scored)		(penalty missed) Beckham; (penalty scored) Owen; (penalty scored) Lampard; (penalty scored) Terry; (penalty scored) Hargreaves; (penalty scored) A. Cole; (penalty missed) Vassell

18 August International Friendly	England	3–0	Ukraine	Newcastle upon Tyne, England
19:45 BST (UTC+01); Match 818	Beckham 27'; Owen 50'; Wright-Phillips 72'	Report		Stadium: St James' Park; Attendance: 35,387; Referee: Mike McCurry (Scotland)

4 September 2006 FIFA World Cup qualification Group 6	Austria	2–2	England	Vienna, Austria
20:30 CEST (UTC+02); Match 819	Kollmann 71'; Ivanschitz 72'	FIFA Report	Lampard 24'; Gerrard 65'	Stadium: Ernst-Happel-Stadion; Attendance: 48,000; Referee: Ľuboš Micheľ (Slovakia)

8 September 2006 FIFA World Cup qualification Group 6	Poland	1–2	England	Chorzów, Poland
20:30 CET (UTC+01); Match 820	Żurawski 48'	FIFA Report	Defoe 37'; Głowacki 58' (o.g.)	Stadium: Stadion Śląski; Attendance: 30,000; Referee: Stefano Farina (Italy)

9 October 2006 FIFA World Cup qualification Group 6	England	2–0	Wales	Manchester, England
15:00 BST (UTC+01); Match 821	Lampard 4'; Beckham 76'	FIFA Report		Stadium: Old Trafford; Attendance: 65,224; Referee: Terje Hauge (Norway)

13 October 2006 FIFA World Cup qualification Group 6	Azerbaijan	0–1	England	Baku, Azerbaijan
21:30 AZST (UTC+05); Match 822		FIFA Report	Owen 22'	Stadium: Tofik Bakhramov Stadium; Attendance: 17,000; Referee: Alain Hamer (Luxembourg)

17 November International Friendly	Spain	1–0	England	Madrid, Spain
21:30 WEST (UTC+01); Match 823	Del Horno 10'	Report		Stadium: Santiago Bernabeu; Attendance: 48,000; Referee: Georgios Kasnaferis (Greece)

=== 2005 ===
9 February International Friendly	England	0–0	Netherlands	Birmingham, England
19:45 GMT (UTC); Match 824		Report		Stadium: Villa Park; Attendance: 40,705; Referee: Peter Frojdfeldt (Sweden)

26 March 2006 FIFA World Cup qualification Group 6	England	4–0	Northern Ireland	Manchester, England
15:00 GMT (UTC); Match 825	J. Cole 47'; Owen 52', 54'; Lampard 62'	FIFA Report		Stadium: Old Trafford; Attendance: 62,239; Referee: Wolfgang Stark (Germany)

30 March 2006 FIFA World Cup qualification Group 6	England	2–0	Azerbaijan	Newcastle upon Tyne, England
19:45 BST (UTC+01); Match 826	Gerrard 51'; Beckham 62'	FIFA Report		Stadium: St James' Park; Attendance: 49,046; Referee: Paulo Costa (Portugal)

28 May International Friendly	United States	1–2	England	Chicago, Illinois, United States
14:06 CDT (UTC−05); Match 827	Dempsey 79'	Report	Richardson 4', 44'	Stadium: Soldier Field; Attendance: 47,637; Referee: Benito Archundia Tellez (Mexico)

31 May International Friendly	England	3–2	Colombia	East Rutherford, New Jersey, United States
16:02 EDT (UTC−04); Match 828	Owen 36', 43', 58'	Report	Yepes 44'; Ramírez 79'	Stadium: Giants Stadium; Attendance: 58,000; Referee: Brian Hall (United States)

17 August International Friendly	Denmark	4–1	England	Copenhagen, Denmark
20:00 CEST (UTC+02); Match 829	Rommedahl 60'; Dahl Tomasson 63'; Gravgaard 67'; Larsen 90+2'	Report	Rooney 87'	Stadium: Parken Stadion; Attendance: 41,438; Referee: Tom Henning Øvrebø (Norway)

3 September 2006 FIFA World Cup qualification Group 6	Wales	0–1	England	Cardiff, Wales
15:00 BST (UTC+01); Match 830		FIFA Report	J. Cole 54'	Stadium: Millennium Stadium; Attendance: 70,715; Referee: Valentin Ivanov (Russia)

7 September 2006 FIFA World Cup qualification Group 6	Northern Ireland	1–0	England	Belfast, Northern Ireland
19:45 BST (UTC+01); Match 831	Healy 73'	FIFA Report		Stadium: Windsor Park; Attendance: 14,069; Referee: Massimo Busacca (Switzerland)

8 October 2006 FIFA World Cup qualification Group 6	England	1–0	Austria	Manchester, England
16:00 BST (UTC+01); Match 832	Lampard 24' (pen.); Beckham (red card) 58'	FIFA Report		Stadium: Old Trafford; Attendance: 64,822; Referee: Luis Medina Cantalejo (Spain)

12 October 2006 FIFA World Cup qualification Group 6	England	2–1	Poland	Manchester, England
19:45 BST (UTC+01); Match 833	Owen 44'; Lampard 81'	FIFA Report	Frankowski 45+1'	Stadium: Old Trafford; Attendance: 65,467; Referee: Kim Milton Nielsen (Denmark)

12 November International Friendly	Argentina	2–3	England	Geneva, Switzerland
17:45 CET (UTC+01); Match 834	Crespo 35'; Samuel 54'	Report	Rooney 39'; Owen 87', 90+2'	Stadium: Stade de Genève; Attendance: 29,000; Referee: Philippe Leuba (Switzerland)

=== 2006 ===
1 March International Friendly	England	2–1	Uruguay	Liverpool, England
20:05 GMT (UTC); Match 835	Crouch 74'; J. Cole 90+3'	Report	Pouso 25'	Stadium: Anfield; Attendance: 40,013; Referee: Stefano Farina (Italy)

30 May International Friendly	England	3–1	Hungary	Manchester, England
20:05 BST (UTC+01); Match 836	Gerrard 45'; Terry 51'; Crouch 84'	Report	Dárdai 55'	Stadium: Old Trafford; Attendance: 56,323; Referee: Pieter Vink (Netherlands)

3 June International Friendly	England	6–0	Jamaica	Manchester, England
14:00 BST (UTC+01); Match 837	Lampard 11'; Taylor 17' (o.g.); Crouch 29', 67', 89'; Owen 32'	Report		Stadium: Old Trafford; Attendance: 70,373; Referee: Konrad Plautz (Austria)

10 June 2006 FIFA World Cup Group B	England	1–0	Paraguay	Frankfurt, Germany
15:00 CEST (UTC+02); Match 838	Gamarra 3' (o.g.)	FIFA Report		Stadium: Waldstadion; Attendance: 48,000; Referee: Marco Rodríguez (Mexico)

15 June 2006 FIFA World Cup Group B	England	2–0	Trinidad and Tobago	Nuremberg, Germany
18:00 CEST (UTC+02); Match 839	Crouch 83'; Gerrard 90+1'	FIFA Report		Stadium: Frankenstadion; Attendance: 41,000; Referee: Toru Kamikawa (Japan)

20 June 2006 FIFA World Cup Group B	Sweden	2–2	England	Cologne, Germany
21:00 CEST (UTC+02); Match 840	Allbäck 51'; Larsson 90'	FIFA Report	J. Cole 34'; Gerrard 85'	Stadium: RheinEnergieStadion; Attendance: 45,000; Referee: Massimo Busacca (Switzerland)

25 June 2006 FIFA World Cup Round of 16	England	1–0	Ecuador	Stuttgart, Germany
17:00 CEST (UTC+02); Match 841	Beckham 60'	FIFA Report		Stadium: Gottlieb-Daimler-Stadion; Attendance: 52,000; Referee: Frank De Bleeckere (Belgium)

1 July 2006 FIFA World Cup Quarter-final	England	0–0 (a.e.t.) (1–3 p)	Portugal	Gelsenkirchen, Germany
17:00 CEST (UTC+02); Match 842	Rooney (red card) 62'	FIFA Report		Stadium: Arena AufSchalke; Attendance: 52,000; Referee: Horacio Elizondo (Argentina)
	Penalties
	Lampard (penalty missed); Hargreaves (penalty scored); Gerrard (penalty missed); Carragher (penalty missed)		(penalty scored) Simão; (penalty missed) Viana; (penalty missed) Petit; (penalty scored) Postiga; (penalty scored) Ronaldo

16 August International Friendly	England	4–0	Greece	Manchester, England
20:05 BST (UTC+01); Match 843	Terry 14'; Lampard 30'; Crouch 34', 42'	Report		Stadium: Old Trafford; Attendance: 45,864; Referee: Wolfgang Stark (Germany)

2 September UEFA Euro 2008 qualifying Group E	England	5–0	Andorra	Manchester, England
17:00 BST (UTC+01); Match 844	Crouch 5', 66'; Gerrard 13'; Defoe 38', 47'	UEFA Report		Stadium: Old Trafford; Attendance: 56,290; Referee: Bernhard Brugger (Austria)

6 September UEFA Euro 2008 qualifying Group E	Macedonia	0–1	England	Skopje, Macedonia
21:00 CEST (UTC+02); Match 845		UEFA Report	Crouch 46'	Stadium: Skopje City Stadium; Attendance: 16,500; Referee: Bertrand Layec (France)

7 October UEFA Euro 2008 qualifying Group E	England	0–0	Macedonia	Manchester, England
17:00 BST (UTC+01); Match 846		UEFA Report		Stadium: Old Trafford; Attendance: 72,062; Referee: Markus Merk (Germany)

11 October UEFA Euro 2008 qualifying Group E	Croatia	2–0	England	Zagreb, Croatia
20:00 CEST (UTC+02); Match 847	Eduardo 61'; G. Neville 68' (o.g.)	UEFA Report		Stadium: Maksimir Stadium; Attendance: 38,000; Referee: Roberto Rosetti (Italy)

15 November International Friendly	Netherlands	1–1	England	Amsterdam, Netherlands
20:00 CET (UTC+01); Match 848	Van der Vaart 86'	Report	Rooney 37'	Stadium: Amsterdam ArenA; Attendance: 44,000; Referee: Lubos Michel (Slovakia)

=== 2007 ===
7 February International Friendly	England	0–1	Spain	Manchester, England
20:00 GMT (UTC); Match 849		Report	Iniesta 63'	Stadium: Old Trafford; Attendance: 58,247; Referee: Michael Weiner (Germany)

24 March UEFA Euro 2008 qualifying Group E	Israel	0–0	England	Ramat Gan, Israel
20:30 IST (UTC+02); Match 850		UEFA Report		Stadium: Ramat Gan Stadium; Attendance: 40,012; Referee: Tom Henning Øvrebø (Norway)

28 March UEFA Euro 2008 qualifying Group E	Andorra	0–3	England	Barcelona, Spain
21:00 CEST (UTC+02); Match 851		UEFA Report	Gerrard 54', 76'; Nugent 90+2'	Stadium: Estadi Olímpic Lluís Companys; Attendance: 12,800; Referee: Bruno Paixão (Portugal)

1 June International Friendly	England	1–1	Brazil	London, England
20:00 BST (UTC+01); Match 852	Terry 68'	Report	Diego 90+2'	Stadium: Wembley Stadium; Attendance: 88,745; Referee: Markus Merk (Germany)

6 June UEFA Euro 2008 qualifying Group E	Estonia	0–3	England	Tallinn, Estonia
21:30 EEST (UTC+03); Match 853		UEFA Report	J. Cole 37'; Crouch 54'; Owen 62'	Stadium: A Le Coq Arena; Attendance: 11,000; Referee: Grzegorz Gilewski (Poland)

22 August International Friendly	England	1–2	Germany	London, England
20:00 BST (UTC+01); Match 854	Lampard 9'	Report	Kurányi 26'; Pander 40'	Stadium: Wembley Stadium; Attendance: 86,133; Referee: Massimo Busacca (Switzerland)

8 September UEFA Euro 2008 qualifying Group E	England	3–0	Israel	London, England
17:00 BST (UTC+01); Match 855	Wright-Phillips 20'; Owen 49'; Richards 66'	UEFA Report		Stadium: Wembley Stadium; Attendance: 85,372; Referee: Pieter Vink (Netherlands)

12 September UEFA Euro 2008 qualifying Group E	England	3–0	Russia	London, England
20:00 BST (UTC+01); Match 856	Owen 7', 31'; Ferdinand 84'	UEFA Report		Stadium: Wembley Stadium; Attendance: 86,106; Referee: Martin Hansson (Sweden)

13 October UEFA Euro 2008 qualifying Group E	England	3–0	Estonia	London, England
15:00 BST (UTC+01); Match 857	Wright-Phillips 11'; Rooney 32'; Rähn 33' (o.g.)	UEFA Report		Stadium: Wembley Stadium; Attendance: 86,665; Referee: Nicolai Vollquartz (Denmark)

17 October UEFA Euro 2008 qualifying Group E	Russia	2–1	England	Moscow, Russia
19:00 MSD (UTC+04); Match 858	Pavlyuchenko 69' (pen.), 73'	UEFA Report	Rooney 29'	Stadium: Luzhniki Stadium; Attendance: 84,700; Referee: Luis Medina Cantalejo (Spain)

16 November International Friendly	Austria	0–1	England	Vienna, Austria
20:00 CET (UTC+01); Match 859		Report	Crouch 44'	Stadium: Ernst Happel Stadion; Attendance: 39,432; Referee: Nicolai Vollquartz (Denmark)

21 November UEFA Euro 2008 qualifying Group E	England	2–3	Croatia	London, England
20:00 GMT (UTC); Match 860	Lampard 56' (pen.); Crouch 65'	Match Report	Kranjčar 8'; Olić 14'; Petrić 77'	Stadium: Wembley Stadium; Attendance: 88,091; Referee: Peter Fröjdfeldt (Sweden)

=== 2008 ===
6 February International Friendly	England	2–1	Switzerland	London, England
20:00 GMT (UTC); Match 861	Jenas 40'; Wright-Phillips 62'	Report	Derdiyok 58'	Stadium: Wembley Stadium; Attendance: 86,857; Referee: Felix Brych (Germany)

26 March International Friendly	France	1–0	England	Paris, France
21:00 CET (UTC+01); Match 862	Ribéry 32' (pen.)	Report		Stadium: Stade de France; Attendance: 78,000; Referee: Florian Meyer (Germany)

28 May International Friendly	England	2–0	United States	London, England
20:05 BST (UTC+01); Match 863	Terry 38'; Gerrard 59'	Report		Stadium: Wembley Stadium; Attendance: 71,233; Referee: Kyros Vassaras (Greece)

1 June International Friendly	Trinidad and Tobago	0–3	England	Port of Spain, Trinidad and Tobago
17:30 UTC−4; Match 864		Report	Barry 12'; Defoe 16', 49'	Stadium: Hasely Crawford Stadium; Attendance: 25,001; Referee: Enrico Wijngaarde (Suriname)

20 August International Friendly	England	2–2	Czech Republic	London, England
20:00 BST (UTC+01); Match 865	Brown 45'; J. Cole 90+2'	Report	Baroš 22'; Jankulovski 48'	Stadium: Wembley Stadium; Attendance: 69,738; Referee: Terje Hauge (Norway)

6 September 2010 FIFA World Cup qualification Group 6	Andorra	0–2	England	Barcelona, Spain
20:00 CEST (UTC+02); Match 866		FIFA Report	J. Cole 49', 55'	Stadium: Estadi Olímpic Lluís Companys; Attendance: 10,300; Referee: Cüneyt Çakır (Turkey)

10 September 2010 FIFA World Cup qualification Group 6	Croatia	1–4	England	Zagreb, Croatia
21:00 CEST (UTC+02); Match 867	Mandžukić 78'; R. Kovač (red card) 52'	FIFA Report	Walcott 26', 59', 82'; Rooney 63'	Stadium: Maksimir Stadium; Attendance: 35,218; Referee: Ľuboš Micheľ (Slovakia)

11 October 2010 FIFA World Cup qualification Group 6	England	5–1	Kazakhstan	London, England
17:15 BST (UTC+01); Match 868	Ferdinand 52'; Kuchma 64' (o.g.); Rooney 76', 86'; Defoe 90'	FIFA Report	Kukeyev 68'	Stadium: Wembley Stadium; Attendance: 89,107; Referee: Paul Allaerts (Belgium)

15 October 2010 FIFA World Cup qualification Group 6	Belarus	1–3	England	Minsk, Belarus
21:30 EEST (UTC+03); Match 869	Sitko 28'	FIFA Report	Gerrard 11'; Rooney 50', 74'	Stadium: Dinamo Stadium; Attendance: 29,600; Referee: Terje Hauge (Norway)

19 November International Friendly	Germany	1–2	England	Berlin, Germany
21:30 CET (UTC+01); Match 870	Helmes 63'	Report	Upson 24'; Terry 84'	Stadium: Olympiastadion; Attendance: 74,244; Referee: Massimo Busacca (Switzerland)

=== 2009 ===
11 February International Friendly	Spain	2–0	England	Seville, Spain
22:00 WEST (UTC+01); Match 871	Villa 36'; Llorente 82'	FA Report		Stadium: Ramón Sánchez Pizjuán Stadium; Attendance: 42,102; Referee: Stéphane Lannoy

28 March International Friendly	England	4–0	Slovakia	London, England
17:15 GMT (UTC); Match 872	Heskey 7'; Rooney 70', 90'; Lampard 82'	FA Report		Stadium: Wembley Stadium; Attendance: 85,512; Referee: Alain Hamer (Luxembourg)

1 April 2010 FIFA World Cup qualification Group 6	England	2–1	Ukraine	London, England
20:00 BST (UTC+01); Match 873	Crouch 29'; Terry 85'	FIFA Report	Shevchenko 74'	Stadium: Wembley Stadium; Attendance: 87,548; Referee: Claus Bo Larsen (Denmark)

6 June 2010 FIFA World Cup qualification Group 6	Kazakhstan	0–4	England	Almaty, Kazakhstan
21:00 UTC+06; Match 874		FIFA Report	Barry 40'; Heskey 45+1'; Rooney 72'; Lampard 77' (pen.)	Stadium: Almaty Central Stadium; Attendance: 24,000; Referee: Kristinn Jakobsson (Iceland)

10 June 2010 FIFA World Cup qualification Group 6	England	6–0	Andorra	London, England
20:15 BST (UTC+01); Match 875	Rooney 4', 39'; Lampard 29'; Defoe 73', 76'; Crouch 81'	FIFA Report		Stadium: Wembley Stadium; Attendance: 57,897; Referee: Bas Nijhuis (Netherlands)

12 August International Friendly	Netherlands	2–2	England	Amsterdam, Netherlands
20:45 CEST (UTC+02); Match 876	Kuyt 10'; Van der Vaart 38'	FA Report	Defoe 49', 77'	Stadium: Amsterdam ArenA; Attendance: 50,000; Referee: Nicola Rizzoli (Italy)

5 September International Friendly	England	2–1	Slovenia	London, England
17:30 BST (UTC+01); Match 877	Lampard 31' (pen.); Defoe 63'	FA Report	Ljubijankić 85'	Stadium: Wembley Stadium; Attendance: 67,232; Referee: Jonas Eriksson (Sweden)

9 September 2010 FIFA World Cup qualification Group 6	England	5–1	Croatia	London, England
20:00 BST (UTC+01); Match 878	Lampard 7' (pen.), 59'; Gerrard 18', 67'; Rooney 77'	FIFA Report	Eduardo 71'	Stadium: Wembley Stadium; Attendance: 87,319; Referee: Alberto Undiano Mallenco (Spain)

10 October 2010 FIFA World Cup qualification Group 6	Ukraine	1–0	England	Dnipropetrovsk, Ukraine
19:15 EEST (UTC+03); Match 879	Nazarenko 29'	FIFA Report	Green (red card) 12'	Stadium: Dnipro Arena; Attendance: 31,000; Referee: Damir Skomina (Slovenia)

14 October 2010 FIFA World Cup qualification Group 6	England	3–0	Belarus	London, England
20:00 BST (UTC+01); Match 880	Crouch 4', 76'; Wright-Phillips 60'	FIFA Report		Stadium: Wembley Stadium; Attendance: 76,897; Referee: Lucilio Cardoso Cortez Batista (Portugal)

14 November International Friendly	Brazil	1–0	England	Doha, Qatar
20:00 UTC+03; Match 881	Nilmar 47'	FA Report		Stadium: Khalifa International Stadium; Attendance: 50,000; Referee: Abdulrahman Abdou (Qatar)

== 2010s ==
=== 2010 ===
3 March International Friendly	England	3–1	Egypt	London, England
20:00 GMT (UTC); Match 882	Crouch 56', 80'; Wright-Phillips 75'	FA Report	Zidan 23'	Stadium: Wembley Stadium; Attendance: 80,602; Referee: Carlos Manuel Torres (Paraguay)

24 May International Friendly	England	3–1	Mexico	London, England
20:00 BST (UTC+01); Match 883	King 17'; Crouch 34'; G. Johnson 47'	FA Report	Franco 45+3'	Stadium: Wembley Stadium; Attendance: 88,638; Referee: Masaaki Toma (Japan)

30 May International Friendly	Japan	1–2	England	Graz, Austria
14:15 CEST (UTC+02); Match 884	Tulio 7'	FA Report	Tulio 72' (o.g.); Nakazawa 83' (o.g.)	Stadium: UPC-Arena; Attendance: 15,326; Referee: Rene Eisner (Austria)

12 June 2010 FIFA World Cup Group C	England	1–1	United States	Rustenburg, South Africa
20:30 SAST (UTC+02); Match 885	Gerrard 4'	FIFA Report	Dempsey 40'	Stadium: Royal Bafokeng Stadium; Attendance: 38,646; Referee: Carlos Simon (Brazil)

18 June 2010 FIFA World Cup Group C	England	0–0	Algeria	Cape Town, South Africa
20:30 SAST (UTC+02); Match 886		FIFA Report		Stadium: Cape Town Stadium; Attendance: 64,100; Referee: Ravshan Irmatov (Uzbekistan)

23 June 2010 FIFA World Cup Group C	Slovenia	0–1	England	Port Elizabeth, South Africa
16:00 SAST (UTC+02); Match 887		FIFA Report	Defoe 23'	Stadium: Nelson Mandela Bay Stadium; Attendance: 36,893; Referee: Wolfgang Stark (Germany)

27 June 2010 FIFA World Cup Round of 16	Germany	4–1	England	Bloemfontein, South Africa
16:00 SAST (UTC+02); Match 888	Klose 20' Podolski 32' Müller 67', 70'	FIFA Report	Upson 37'	Stadium: Free State Stadium; Attendance: 40,510; Referee: Jorge Larrionda (Uruguay)

11 August International Friendly	England	2–1	Hungary	London, England
20:00 BST (UTC+01); Match 889	Gerrard 69', 73'	FA Report	Jagielka 62' (o.g.)	Stadium: Wembley Stadium; Attendance: 72,024; Referee: Stéphane Lannoy (France)

3 September UEFA Euro 2012 qualifying Group G	England	4–0	Bulgaria	London, England
20:00 BST (UTC+01); Match 890	Defoe 3', 61', 86'; A. Johnson 83'	Report		Stadium: Wembley Stadium; Attendance: 73,426; Referee: Viktor Kassai (Hungary)

7 September UEFA Euro 2012 qualifying Group G	Switzerland	1–3	England	Basel, Switzerland
20:00 BST (UTC+01); Match 891	Shaqiri 71'	Report	Rooney 10'; A. Johnson 69'; Bent 88'	Stadium: St. Jakob Park; Attendance: 26,000; Referee: Nicola Rizzoli (Italy)

12 October UEFA Euro 2012 qualifying Group G	England	0–0	Montenegro	London, England
20:00 UTC+1; Match 892		Report		Stadium: Wembley Stadium; Attendance: 73,451; Referee: Manuel Gräfe (Germany)

17 November International Friendly	England	1–2	France	London, England
20:00 UTC; Match 893	Crouch 86'	FA Report	Benzema 16'; Valbuena 55'	Stadium: Wembley Stadium; Attendance: 85,495; Referee: Claus Bo Larsen (Denmark)

=== 2011 ===
9 February International Friendly	Denmark	1–2	England	Copenhagen, Denmark
19:15; Match 894	Agger 7'	FA Report	Bent 10'; Young 68'	Stadium: Parken Stadion; Attendance: 21,523; Referee: Jonas Eriksson (Sweden)

26 March UEFA Euro 2012 qualifying Group G	Wales	0–2	England	Cardiff, Wales
15:00; Match 895		FA Report	Lampard 7' (pen.); Bent 14'	Stadium: Millennium Stadium; Attendance: 68,959; Referee: Olegário Benquerença (Portugal)

29 March International Friendly	England	1–1	Ghana	London, England
19:45; Match 896	Carroll 43'	FA Report	Gyan 90+1'	Stadium: Wembley Stadium; Attendance: 80,102; Referee: Cüneyt Çakır (Turkey)

4 June UEFA Euro 2012 qualifying Group G	England	2–2	Switzerland	London, England
16:45; Match 897	Lampard 37' (pen.); Young 51'	Report	Barnetta 32', 35'	Stadium: Wembley Stadium; Attendance: 84,459; Referee: Damir Skomina (Slovenia)

2 September UEFA Euro 2012 qualifying Group G	Bulgaria	0–3	England	Sofia, Bulgaria
21:15 UTC+3; Match 898		Report	Cahill 13'; Rooney 21', 45+1'	Stadium: Vasil Levski National Stadium; Attendance: 36,521; Referee: Frank De Bleeckere (Belgium)

6 September UEFA Euro 2012 qualifying Group G	England	1–0	Wales	London, England
19:45 UTC+1; Match 899	Young 35'	Report		Stadium: Wembley Stadium; Attendance: 77,128; Referee: Robert Schörgenhofer (Austria)

7 October UEFA Euro 2012 qualifying Group G	Montenegro	2–2	England	Podgorica, Montenegro
21:00 UTC+2; Match 900	Zverotić 45'; Delibašić 90+1'	Report	Young 11'; Bent 31'; Rooney (red card) 75'	Stadium: Podgorica City Stadium; Attendance: 12,700; Referee: Wolfgang Stark (Germany)

12 November International Friendly	England	1–0	Spain	London, England
17:15 UTC±0; Match 901	Lampard 49'	FA Report		Stadium: Wembley Stadium; Attendance: 87,189; Referee: Frank De Bleeckere (Belgium)

15 November International Friendly	England	1–0	Sweden	London, England
20:00 UTC±0; Match 902	Barry 22'	FA Report		Stadium: Wembley Stadium; Attendance: 48,876; Referee: Pavel Kravolec (Czech Republic)

=== 2012 ===
29 February International Friendly	England	2–3	Netherlands	London, England
20:00 GMT; Match 903	Cahill 85'; Young 90'	FA Report	Robben 57', 90+2'; Huntelaar 58'	Stadium: Wembley Stadium; Attendance: 76,283; Referee: Felix Brych (Germany)

26 May International Friendly	Norway	0–1	England	Oslo, Norway
20:45 UTC+2; Match 904		Report	Young 9'	Stadium: Ullevaal Stadion; Attendance: 21,496; Referee: Michael Weiner (Germany)

2 June International Friendly	England	1–0	Belgium	London, England
17:15 BST; Match 905	Welbeck 37'	Report		Stadium: Wembley Stadium; Attendance: 85,091; Referee: Peter Rasmussen (Denmark)

11 June UEFA Euro 2012 Group D	France	1–1	England	Donetsk, Ukraine
19:00 UTC+3; Match 906	Nasri 39'	UEFA Report	Lescott 30'	Stadium: Donbas Arena; Attendance: 47,400; Referee: Nicola Rizzoli (Italy)

15 June UEFA Euro 2012 Group D	Sweden	2–3	England	Kyiv, Ukraine
22:00 UTC+3; Match 907	Johnson 49' (o.g.); Mellberg 59'	UEFA Report	Carroll 23'; Walcott 64'; Welbeck 78'	Stadium: Olimpiysky Stadium; Attendance: 64,640; Referee: Damir Skomina (Slovenia)

19 June UEFA Euro 2012 Group D	England	1–0	Ukraine	Donetsk, Ukraine
21:45 UTC+3; Match 908	Rooney 48'	UEFA Report		Stadium: Donbas Arena; Attendance: 48,700; Referee: Viktor Kassai (Hungary)

24 June UEFA Euro 2012 Quarter-final	England	0–0 (a.e.t.) (2–4 p)	Italy	Kyiv, Ukraine
20:45 CEST; 21:45 Local time Match 909		UEFA Report		Stadium: Olimpiysky Stadium; Attendance: 64,340; Referee: Pedro Proença (Portugal)
	Penalties
	Gerrard (penalty scored); Rooney (penalty scored); Young (penalty missed); Cole (penalty missed)		(penalty scored) Balotelli; (penalty missed) Montolivo; (penalty scored) Pirlo; (penalty scored) Nocerino; (penalty scored) Diamanti

15 August International Friendly	Italy	1–2	England	Bern, Switzerland
20:00 BST; Match 910	De Rossi 15'	Report	Jagielka 27'; Defoe 79'	Stadium: Stade de Suisse; Attendance: 15,000; Referee: Sascha Kever (Switzerland)

7 September 2014 FIFA World Cup qualification Group H	Moldova	0–5	England	Chișinău, Moldova
21:45 UTC+3; Match 911		Report	Lampard 3' (pen.), 29'; Defoe 32'; Milner 74'; Baines 83'	Stadium: Zimbru Stadium; Attendance: 10,250; Referee: Pol van Boekel (Netherlands)

11 September 2014 FIFA World Cup qualification Group H	England	1–1	Ukraine	London, England
20:00 BST (UTC+01); Match 912	Lampard 87' (pen.); Gerrard (red card) 88'	Report	Konoplyanka 38'	Stadium: Wembley Stadium; Attendance: 68,102; Referee: Cüneyt Çakır (Turkey)

12 October 2014 FIFA World Cup qualification Group H	England	5–0	San Marino	London, England
20:00 BST (UTC+01); Match 913	Rooney 35' (pen.), 69'; Welbeck 38', 71'; Oxlade-Chamberlain 77'	Report		Stadium: Wembley Stadium; Attendance: 86,645; Referee: Gediminas Mazeika (Lithuania)

17 October 2014 FIFA World Cup qualification Group H	Poland	1–1	England	Warsaw, Poland
17:00 CEST (UTC+02); Match 914 (Note: Match postponed from the previous evening due to a waterlogged pitch.)	Glik 70'	Report	Rooney 31'	Stadium: National Stadium; Attendance: 47,000; Referee: Gianluca Rocchi (Italy)

14 November International Friendly	Sweden	4–2	England	Stockholm, Sweden
19:30 GMT; Match 915	Ibrahimović 20', 77', 84', 90+2'	Report	Welbeck 35'; Caulker 38'	Stadium: Friends Arena; Attendance: 49,967; Referee: Svein Oddvar Moen (Norway)

=== 2013 ===
6 February International Friendly	England	2–1	Brazil	London, England
19:30 GMT; Match 916	Rooney 27'; Lampard 61'	FA Report	Fred 48'	Stadium: Wembley Stadium; Attendance: 87,453; Referee: Pedro Proença (Portugal)

22 March 2014 FIFA World Cup qualification Group H	San Marino	0–8	England	Serravalle, San Marino
20:00 GMT; Match 917		Report	Della Valle 12' (o.g.); Oxlade-Chamberlain 28'; Defoe 35', 77'; Young 39'; Lampard 44'; Rooney 54'; Sturridge 70'	Stadium: Stadio Olimpico; Attendance: 4,900; Referee: Alain Bieri (Switzerland)

26 March 2014 FIFA World Cup qualification Group H	Montenegro	1–1	England	Podgorica, Montenegro
20:00 GMT; Match 918	Damjanović 75'	Report	Rooney 6'	Stadium: Stadion Pod Goricom; Attendance: 12,000; Referee: Jonas Eriksson (Sweden)

29 May International Friendly	England	1–1	Republic of Ireland	London, England
20:00 BST; Match 919	Lampard 23'	Report	Long 13'	Stadium: Wembley Stadium; Attendance: 80,126; Referee: William Collum (Scotland)

2 June International Friendly	Brazil	2–2	England	Rio de Janeiro, Brazil
20:00 BST; Match 920	Fred 57'; Paulinho 82'		Oxlade-Chamberlain 67'; Rooney 79'	Stadium: Estádio do Maracanã; Attendance: 66,000; Referee: Wilmar Roldan (Colombia)

14 August International Friendly	England	3–2	Scotland	London, England
20:00 BST; Match 921	Walcott 29'; Welbeck 53'; Lambert 70'	Report	Morrison 11'; Miller 49'	Stadium: Wembley Stadium; Attendance: 80,485; Referee: Felix Brych (Germany)

6 September 2014 FIFA World Cup qualification Group H	England	4–0	Moldova	London, England
20:00 BST; Match 922	Gerrard 12'; Lambert 27'; Welbeck 45+1', 50'	FIFA report		Stadium: Wembley Stadium; Attendance: 61,607; Referee: Ivan Kružliak (Slovakia)

10 September 2014 FIFA World Cup qualification Group H	Ukraine	0–0	England	Kyiv, Ukraine
19:45 BST; Match 923		Report		Stadium: Olympic Stadium; Attendance: 69,890; Referee: Pedro Proença (Portugal)

11 October 2014 FIFA World Cup qualification Group H	England	4–1	Montenegro	London, England
20:00 BST; Match 924	Rooney 48'; Bošković 62' (o.g.); Townsend 78'; Sturridge 90' (pen.)	Report	Damjanović 71'	Stadium: Wembley; Attendance: 83,807; Referee: Alberto Undiano Mallenco (Spain)

15 October 2014 FIFA World Cup qualification Group H	England	2–0	Poland	London, England
20:00 BST; Match 925	Rooney 41'; Gerrard 88'	Report		Stadium: Wembley Stadium; Attendance: 85,186; Referee: Damir Skomina (Slovenia)

15 November International Friendly	England	0–2	Chile	London, England
20:00 GMT; Match 926		Report	Sánchez 7', 90+4'	Stadium: Wembley Stadium; Attendance: 62,963; Referee: Florian Meyer (Germany)

19 November International Friendly	England	0–1	Germany	London, England
20:00 GMT; Match 927		Report	Mertesacker 39'	Stadium: Wembley Stadium; Attendance: 85,934; Referee: Stéphane Lannoy (France)

=== 2014 ===
5 March International Friendly	England	1–0	Denmark	London, England
20:00 GMT; Match 928	Sturridge 82'	Report		Stadium: Wembley Stadium; Attendance: 68,573; Referee: Kevin Blom (Netherlands)

30 May International Friendly	England	3–0	Peru	London, England
20:00 BST; Match 929	Sturridge 32'; Cahill 65'; Jagielka 70'	Report		Stadium: Wembley Stadium; Attendance: 83,578; Referee: Viktor Kassai (Hungary)

4 June International Friendly	Ecuador	2–2	England	Miami Gardens, Florida, United States
20:00 BST	E. Valencia 8'; Arroyo 70'; A. Valencia (red card) 79'	Report	Rooney 29'; Lambert 51'; Sterling (red card) 79'	Stadium: Sun Life Stadium; Attendance: 21,534; Referee: Jair Marrufo (United States)

7 June International Friendly	England	0–0	Honduras	Miami Gardens, Florida, United States
21:45 BST; Match 931		Report		Stadium: Sun Life Stadium; Attendance: 45,379; Referee: Ricardo Salazar (United States)

14 June 2014 FIFA World Cup Group D	England	1–2	Italy	Manaus, Brazil
23:00 BST; Match 932	Sturridge 37'	Report	Marchisio 35'; Balotelli 50'	Stadium: Arena da Amazônia; Attendance: 39,800; Referee: Björn Kuipers (Netherlands)

19 June 2014 FIFA World Cup Group D	Uruguay	2–1	England	São Paulo, Brazil
20:00 BST; Match 933	Suárez 39', 85'	Report	Rooney 75'	Stadium: Arena de São Paulo; Attendance: 62,575; Referee: Carlos Velasco Carballo (Spain)

24 June 2014 FIFA World Cup Group D	Costa Rica	0–0	England	Belo Horizonte, Brazil
17:00 BST; Match 934		Report		Stadium: Estádio Mineirão; Attendance: 57,823; Referee: Djamel Haimoudi (Algeria)

3 September International Friendly	England	1–0	Norway	London, England
20:00 BST; Match 935	Rooney 68' (pen.)	Report		Stadium: Wembley Stadium; Attendance: 40,181; Referee: Jorge Sousa (Portugal)

8 September UEFA Euro 2016 qualifying Group E	Switzerland	0–2	England	Basel, Switzerland
19:45 BST; Match 936		Report	Welbeck 58', 90+4'	Stadium: St. Jakob-Park; Attendance: 35,500; Referee: Cüneyt Çakır (Turkey)

9 October UEFA Euro 2016 qualifying Group E	England	5–0	San Marino	London, England
19:45 BST; Match 937	Jagielka 24'; Rooney 43' (pen.); Welbeck 49'; Townsend 72'; Della Valle 77' (o.g.)	Report		Stadium: Wembley Stadium; Attendance: 55,990; Referee: Marcin Borski (Poland)

12 October UEFA Euro 2016 qualifying Group E	Estonia	0–1	England	Tallinn, Estonia
17:00 BST; Match 938		Report	Rooney 74'	Stadium: A. Le Coq Arena; Attendance: 10,195; Referee: Marijo Strahonja (Croatia)

15 November UEFA Euro 2016 qualifying Group E	England	3–1	Slovenia	London, England
17:00 GMT; Match 939	Rooney 59' (pen.); Welbeck 66', 72'	Report	Henderson 58' (o.g.)	Stadium: Wembley Stadium; Attendance: 82,305; Referee: Olegário Benquerença (Portugal)

18 November International Friendly	Scotland	1–3	England	Glasgow, Scotland
20:00 GMT; Match 940	Robertson 83'	Report	Oxlade-Chamberlain 32' Rooney 47', 85'	Stadium: Celtic Park; Attendance: 55,000; Referee: Jonas Eriksson (Sweden)

=== 2015 ===
27 March UEFA Euro 2016 qualifying Group E	England	4–0	Lithuania	London, England
19:45 GMT; Match 941	Rooney 7'; Welbeck 45'; Sterling 58'; Kane 73'	Report		Stadium: Wembley Stadium; Attendance: 83,671; Referee: Pavel Královec (Czech Republic)

31 March International Friendly	Italy	1–1	England	Turin, Italy
19:45 BST; Match 942	Pellè 29'	Report	Townsend 79'	Stadium: Juventus Stadium; Attendance: 31,138; Referee: Felix Brych (Germany)

7 June International Friendly	Republic of Ireland	0–0	England	Dublin, Republic of Ireland
13:00 BST; Match 943		Report		Stadium: Aviva Stadium; Attendance: 43,486; Referee: Arnold Hunter (Northern Ireland)

14 June UEFA Euro 2016 qualifying Group E	Slovenia	2–3	England	Ljubljana, Slovenia
17:00 BST; Match 944	Novaković 37'; Pečnik 84'	Report	Wilshere 57', 73'; Rooney 86'	Stadium: Stadion Stožice; Attendance: 15,796; Referee: Alberto Undiano Mallenco (Spain)

5 September UEFA Euro 2016 qualifying Group E	San Marino	0–6	England	Serravalle, San Marino
17:00 BST; Match 945		Report	Rooney 13' (pen.); Brolli 30' (o.g.); Barkley 46'; Walcott 68', 78'; Kane 77'	Stadium: Stadio Olimpico; Attendance: 4,378; Referee: Leontios Trattou (Cyprus)

8 September UEFA Euro 2016 qualifying Group E	England	2–0	Switzerland	London, England
19:45 BST; Match 946	Kane 67'; Rooney 84' (pen.)	Report		Stadium: Wembley Stadium; Attendance: 75,751; Referee: Gianluca Rocchi (Italy)

9 October UEFA Euro 2016 qualifying Group E	England	2–0	Estonia	London, England
19:45 BST; Match 947	Walcott 45'; Sterling 85'	Report		Stadium: Wembley Stadium; Attendance: 75,427; Referee: István Vad (Hungary)

12 October UEFA Euro 2016 qualifying Group E	Lithuania	0–3	England	Vilnius, Lithuania
19:45 BST; Match 948		UEFA Report	Barkley 29'; Arlauskis 35' (o.g.); Oxlade-Chamberlain 62'	Stadium: LFF Stadium; Attendance: 5,051; Referee: Kenn Hansen (Denmark)

13 November International Friendly	Spain	2–0	England	Alicante, Spain
19:45 GMT	Mario Gaspar 72'; Cazorla 84'	Report		Stadium: Estadio José Rico Pérez; Attendance: 29,500; Referee: Paolo Mazzoleni (Italy)

17 November International Friendly	England	2–0	France	London, England
20:00 GMT; Match 950	Alli 39'; Rooney 48'	Report		Stadium: Wembley Stadium; Attendance: 71,223; Referee: Jonas Eriksson (Sweden)

=== 2016 ===
26 March International Friendly	Germany	2–3	England	Berlin, Germany
19:45 GMT; Match 951	Kroos 43'; Gómez 57'	Report	Kane 61'; Vardy 74'; Dier 90+1'	Stadium: Olympiastadion; Attendance: 70,000; Referee: Gianluca Rocchi (Italy)

29 March International Friendly	England	1–2	Netherlands	London, England
20:00 BST; Match 952	Vardy 41'	Report	Janssen 50'; Narsingh 77'	Stadium: Wembley Stadium; Attendance: 82,831; Referee: Antonio Miguel Lahoz (Spain)

22 May International Friendly	England	2–1	Turkey	Manchester, England
17:15 BST; Match 953	Kane 3'; Vardy 83'	Report	Çalhanoğlu 13'	Stadium: Etihad Stadium; Attendance: 44,866; Referee: Deniz Aytekin (Germany)

27 May International Friendly	England	2–1	Australia	Sunderland, England
19:45 BST; Match 954	Rashford 3'; Rooney 55'	Report	Dier 75' (o.g.)	Stadium: Stadium of Light; Attendance: 46,595; Referee: Danny Makkelie (Netherlands)

2 June International Friendly	England	1–0	Portugal	London, England
19:45 BST; Match 955	Smalling 86'	Report	Alves (red card) 35'	Stadium: Wembley Stadium; Attendance: 82,503; Referee: Marco Guida (Italy)

11 June UEFA Euro 2016 Group B	England	1–1	Russia	Marseille, France
20:00 BST; Match 956	Dier 73'	Report	Berezutski 90+2'	Stadium: Stade Vélodrome; Attendance: 62,343; Referee: Nicola Rizzoli (Italy)

16 June UEFA Euro 2016 Group B	England	2–1	Wales	Lens, France
14:00 BST; Match 957	Vardy 56'; Sturridge 90'	Report	Bale 42'	Stadium: Stade Bollaert-Delelis; Attendance: 34,033; Referee: Felix Brych (Germany)

20 June UEFA Euro 2016 Group B	Slovakia	0–0	England	Saint-Étienne, France
20:00 BST; Match 958		Report		Stadium: Stade Geoffroy-Guichard; Attendance: 39,051; Referee: Carlos Velasco Carballo (Spain)

27 June UEFA Euro 2016 Round of 16	England	1–2	Iceland	Nice, France
20:00 BST; Match 959	Rooney 4' (pen.)	Report	R. Sigurðsson 6'; K. Sigþórsson 18'	Stadium: Allianz Riviera; Attendance: 33,901; Referee: Damir Skomina (Slovenia)

4 September 2018 FIFA World Cup qualification Group F	Slovakia	0–1	England	Trnava, Slovakia
17:00 BST; Match 960	Škrtel (red card) 57'	Report	Lallana 90+5'	Stadium: Štadión Antona Malatinského; Attendance: 18,111; Referee: Milorad Mažić (Serbia)

8 October 2018 FIFA World Cup qualification Group F	England	2–0	Malta	London, England
17:00 BST; Match 961	Sturridge 29'; Alli 38'	Report		Stadium: Wembley Stadium; Attendance: 81,781; Referee: Stefan Johannesson (Sweden)

11 October 2018 FIFA World Cup qualification Group F	Slovenia	0–0	England	Ljublijana, Slovenia
19:45 BST; Match 962		Report		Stadium: Stožice Stadium; Attendance: 13,274; Referee: Deniz Aytekin (Germany)

11 November 2018 FIFA World Cup qualification Group F	England	3–0	Scotland	London, England
19:45 GMT; Match 963	Sturridge 24'; Lallana 50'; Cahill 61'	Report		Stadium: Wembley Stadium; Attendance: 87,258; Referee: Cüneyt Çakır (Turkey)

15 November International Friendly	England	2–2	Spain	London, England
20:00 GMT; Match 964	Lallana 9' (pen.); Vardy 48'	Report	Aspas 89'; Isco 90+6'	Stadium: Wembley Stadium; Attendance: 83,716; Referee: Ovidiu Hategan (Romania)

=== 2017 ===
22 March International Friendly	Germany	1–0	England	Dortmund, Germany
19:45 GMT; Match 965	Podolski 69'	Report		Stadium: Westfalenstadion; Attendance: 60,109; Referee: Damir Skomina (Slovenia)

26 March 2018 FIFA World Cup qualification Group F	England	2–0	Lithuania	London, England
17:00 BST; Match 966	Defoe 22'; Vardy 66'	Report		Stadium: Wembley Stadium; Attendance: 77,690; Referee: Ruddy Buquet (France)

10 June 2018 FIFA World Cup qualification Group F	Scotland	2–2	England	Glasgow, Scotland
17:00 BST; Match 967	Griffiths 87', 90'	Report	Oxlade-Chamberlain 70'; Kane 90+3'	Stadium: Hampden Park; Attendance: 48,520; Referee: Paolo Tagliavento (Italy)

13 June International Friendly	France	3–2	England	Paris, France
20:00 BST; Match 968	Umtiti 22'; Sidibé 43'; Varane (red card) 47'; Dembélé 78'	Report	Kane 9', 48' (pen.)	Stadium: Stade de France; Attendance: 75,000; Referee: Davide Massa (Italy)

1 September 2018 FIFA World Cup qualification Group F	Malta	0–4	England	Ta' Qali, Malta
19:45 BST; Match 969		Report	Kane 53', 90+2'; Bertrand 85'; Welbeck 90+1'	Stadium: National Stadium; Attendance: 16,994; Referee: Artur Dias Soares (Portugal)

4 September 2018 FIFA World Cup qualification Group F	England	2–1	Slovakia	London, England
19:45 BST; Match 970	Dier 37'; Rashford 59'	Report	Lobotka 3'	Stadium: Wembley Stadium; Attendance: 67,823; Referee: Clement Turpin (France)

5 October 2018 FIFA World Cup qualification Group F	England	1–0	Slovenia	London, England
19:45 BST; Match 971	Kane 90+2'	Report		Stadium: Wembley Stadium; Attendance: 61,598; Referee: Felix Zwayer (Germany)

8 October 2018 FIFA World Cup qualification Group F	Lithuania	0–1	England	Vilnius, Lithuania
17:00 BST; Match 972		Report	Kane 27' (pen.)	Stadium: LFF Stadium; Attendance: 5,067; Referee: Orel Grinfeld (Israel)

10 November International Friendly	England	0–0	Germany	London, England
20:00 GMT; Match 973		Report		Stadium: Wembley Stadium; Attendance: 81,382; Referee: Paweł Raczkowski (Poland)

14 November International Friendly	England	0–0	Brazil	London, England
20:00 GMT; Match 974		Report		Stadium: Wembley Stadium; Attendance: 84,595; Referee: Artur Soares Dias (Portugal)

=== 2018 ===
23 March International Friendly	Netherlands	0–1	England	Amsterdam, Netherlands
19:45 GMT; Match 975		Report	Lingard 59'	Stadium: Amsterdam Arena; Attendance: 51,500; Referee: Jesús Gil Manzano (Spain)

27 March International Friendly	England	1–1	Italy	London, England
20:00 BST; Match 976	Vardy 26'	Report	Insigne 87' (pen.)	Stadium: Wembley Stadium; Attendance: 82,598; Referee: Deniz Aytekin (Germany)

2 June International Friendly	England	2–1	Nigeria	London, England
17:15 BST; Match 977	Cahill 7'; Kane 39'	Report	Iwobi 47'	Stadium: Wembley Stadium; Attendance: 70,025; Referee: Marco Guida (Italy)

7 June International Friendly	England	2–0	Costa Rica	Leeds, England
20:00 BST; Match 978	Rashford 13'; Welbeck 76'	Report		Stadium: Elland Road; Attendance: 36,104; Referee: Hiroyuki Kimura (Japan)

18 June 2018 FIFA World Cup Group G	Tunisia	1–2	England	Volgograd, Russia
21:00 MSK (UTC+3); Match 979	Sassi 35' (pen.)	Report	Kane 11', 90+1'	Stadium: Volgograd Arena; Attendance: 41,064; Referee: Wilmar Roldán (Colombia)

24 June 2018 FIFA World Cup Group G	England	6–1	Panama	Nizhny Novgorod, Russia
15:00 MSK (UTC+3); Match 980	Stones 8', 40'; Kane 22' (pen.), 45+1' (pen.), 62'; Lingard 36'	Report	Baloy 78'	Stadium: Nizhny Novgorod Stadium; Attendance: 43,319; Referee: Gehad Grisha (Egypt)

28 June 2018 FIFA World Cup Group G	England	0–1	Belgium	Kaliningrad, Russia
20:00 KALT (UTC+2); Match 981		Report	Januzaj 51'	Stadium: Kaliningrad Stadium; Attendance: 33,973; Referee: Damir Skomina (Slovenia)

3 July 2018 FIFA World Cup Round of 16	Colombia	1–1 (a.e.t.) (3–4 p)	England	Moscow, Russia
21:00 MSK (UTC+3); Match 982	Mina 90+3'	Report	Kane 57' (pen.)	Stadium: Spartak Stadium; Attendance: 44,190; Referee: Mark Geiger (United States)
	Penalties
	Falcao (penalty scored); Ju. Cuadrado (penalty scored); Muriel (penalty scored); Uribe (penalty missed); Bacca (penalty missed)		(penalty scored) Kane; (penalty scored) Rashford; (penalty missed) Henderson; (penalty scored) Trippier; (penalty scored) Dier

7 July 2018 FIFA World Cup Quarter-final	Sweden	0–2	England	Samara, Russia
18:00 SAMT (UTC+4); Match 983		Report	Maguire 30'; Alli 59'	Stadium: Cosmos Arena; Attendance: 39,991; Referee: Björn Kuipers (Netherlands)

11 July 2018 FIFA World Cup Semi-final	Croatia	2–1 (a.e.t.)	England	Moscow, Russia
21:00 MSK (UTC+3); Match 984	Perišić 68'; Mandžukić 109'	Report	Trippier 5'	Stadium: Luzhniki Stadium; Attendance: 78,011; Referee: Cüneyt Çakır (Turkey)

14 July 2018 FIFA World Cup Third place	Belgium	2–0	England	Saint Petersburg, Russia
17:00 MSK (UTC+3); Match 985	Meunier 4'; E. Hazard 82'	Report		Stadium: Krestovsky Stadium; Attendance: 64,406; Referee: Alireza Faghani (Iran)

8 September 2018–19 UEFA Nations League A Group 4	England	1–2	Spain	London, England
19:45 BST; Match 986	Rashford 11'	Report	Saúl 13'; Rodrigo 32'	Stadium: Wembley Stadium; Attendance: 81,392; Referee: Danny Makkelie (Netherlands)

11 September International Friendly	England	1–0	Switzerland	Leicester, England
20:00 BST; Match 987	Rashford 54'	Report		Stadium: King Power Stadium; Attendance: 30,256; Referee: Clément Turpin (France)

12 October 2018–19 UEFA Nations League A Group 4	Croatia	0–0	England	Rijeka, Croatia
19:45 BST; Match 988		Report		Stadium: Stadion Rujevica; Attendance: 0 Referee: Felix Brych (Germany)

15 October 2018–19 UEFA Nations League A Group 4	Spain	2–3	England	Seville, Spain
19:45 BST; Match 989	Alcácer 58'; Ramos 90+8'	Report	Sterling 16', 38'; Rashford 30'	Stadium: Estadio Benito Villamarín; Attendance: 50,355; Referee: Szymon Marciniak (Poland)

15 November International Friendly	England	3–0	United States	London, England
20:00 GMT; Match 990	Lingard 25'; Alexander-Arnold 27'; Wilson 77'	Report		Stadium: Wembley Stadium; Attendance: 68,155; Referee: Jesús Gil Manzano (Spain)

18 November 2018–19 UEFA Nations League A Group 4	England	2–1	Croatia	London, England
14:00 GMT; Match 991	Lingard 78'; Kane 85'	Report	Kramarić 57'	Stadium: Wembley Stadium; Attendance: 78,221; Referee: Anastasios Sidiropoulos (Greece)

=== 2019 ===
22 March UEFA Euro 2020 qualifying Group A	England	5–0	Czech Republic	London, England
19:45 GMT; Match 992	Sterling 24', 62', 68'; Kane 45+2' (pen.); Kalas 84' (o.g.)	Report		Stadium: Wembley Stadium; Attendance: 82,575; Referee: Artur Soares Dias (Portugal)

25 March UEFA Euro 2020 qualifying Group A	Montenegro	1–5	England	Podgorica, Montenegro
19:45 GMT; Match 993	Vešović 18'	Report	Keane 30'; Barkley 39' 59'; Kane 71'; Sterling 81'	Stadium: Podgorica City Stadium; Attendance: 8,329; Referee: Aleksei Kulbakov (Belarus)

6 June 2019 UEFA Nations League Semi-final	Netherlands	3–1 (a.e.t.)	England	Guimarães, Portugal
19:45; Match 994	De Ligt 73'; Walker 97' (o.g.); Promes 114'	Report	Rashford 32' (pen.)	Stadium: Estádio D. Afonso Henriques; Attendance: 25,711; Referee: Clément Turpin (France)

9 June 2019 UEFA Nations League Third place	Switzerland	0–0 (a.e.t.) (5–6 p)	England	Guimarães, Portugal
14:00; Match 995		Report		Stadium: Estádio D. Afonso Henriques; Attendance: 15,742; Referee: Ovidiu Hațegan (Romania)
	Penalties
	Zuber (penalty scored); Xhaka (penalty scored); Akanji (penalty scored); Mbabu (penalty scored); Schär (penalty scored); Drmić (penalty missed)		(penalty scored) Maguire; (penalty scored) Barkley; (penalty scored) Sancho; (penalty scored) Sterling; (penalty scored) Pickford; (penalty scored) Dier

7 September UEFA Euro 2020 qualifying Group A	England	4–0	Bulgaria	London, England
17:00 BST; Match 996	Kane 24', 50' (pen.), 73' (pen.); Sterling 55'	Report		Stadium: Wembley Stadium; Attendance: 82,605; Referee: Marco Guida (Italy)

10 September UEFA Euro 2020 qualifying Group A	England	5–3	Kosovo	Southampton, England
19:45 BST; Match 997	Sterling 8'; Kane 19'; Vojvoda 38' (o.g.); Sancho 44', 45+1'	Report	V. Berisha 1', 49'; Muriqi 55' (pen.)	Stadium: St Mary's Stadium; Attendance: 30,155; Referee: Felix Zwayer (Germany)

11 October UEFA Euro 2020 qualifying Group A	Czech Republic	2–1	England	Prague, Czech Republic
19:45 BST; Match 998	Brabec 9'; Ondrášek 85'	Report	Kane 5' (pen.)	Stadium: Sinobo Stadium; Attendance: 18,651; Referee: Damir Skomina (Slovenia)

14 October UEFA Euro 2020 qualifying Group A	Bulgaria	0–6	England	Sofia, Bulgaria
19:45 BST; Match 999		Report	Rashford 7'; Barkley 20', 32'; Sterling 45+3', 69'; Kane 85'	Stadium: Vasil Levski National Stadium; Attendance: 17,481; Referee: Ivan Bebek (Croatia)

14 November UEFA Euro 2020 qualifying Group A	England	7–0	Montenegro	London, England
19:45 GMT; Match 1,000	Oxlade-Chamberlain 11'; Kane 19', 24', 37'; Rashford 30'; Šofranac 66' (o.g.); Abraham 84'	Report		Stadium: Wembley Stadium; Attendance: 77,277; Referee: Antonio Mateu Lahoz (Spain)

17 November UEFA Euro 2020 qualifying Group A	Kosovo	0–4	England	Pristina, Kosovo
17:00 GMT; Match 1,001		Report	Winks 32'; Kane 79'; Rashford 83'; Mount 90+1'	Stadium: Fadil Vokrri Stadium; Attendance: 12,326; Referee: Paweł Gil (Poland)

== Head to head records ==
As of matches played from 01 Jan 2000 to 31 Dec 2019

Head to head records
Opponent	Pld	W	D	L	GF	GA	W%	D%	L%
Germany	10	4	1	5	13	13	40.0	10.0	50.0
Croatia	9	5	1	3	21	13	55.6	11.1	33.3
Netherlands	9	1	4	4	9	14	11.1	44.4	44.4
Spain	9	3	1	5	10	12	33.3	11.1	55.6
Sweden	8	3	3	2	12	11	37.5	37.5	25.0
Switzerland	8	6	2	0	15	4	75.0	25.0	0.0
Brazil	7	1	4	2	7	8	14.3	57.1	28.6
France	7	1	2	4	8	10	14.3	28.6	57.1
Italy	7	1	3	3	6	8	14.3	42.9	42.9
Ukraine	7	4	2	1	9	3	57.1	28.6	14.3
Montenegro	6	3	3	0	19	5	50.0	50.0	0.0
Portugal	6	1	4	1	7	7	16.7	66.7	16.7
Slovakia	6	5	1	0	11	3	83.3	16.7	0.0
Slovenia	6	5	1	0	10	4	83.3	16.7	0.0
Denmark	5	3	0	2	9	8	60.0	0.0	40.0
Wales	5	5	0	0	8	1	100.0	0.0	0.0
Andorra	4	4	0	0	16	0	100.0	0.0	0.0
Bulgaria	4	4	0	0	17	0	100.0	0.0	0.0
Estonia	4	4	0	0	9	0	100.0	0.0	0.0
Lithuania	4	4	0	0	10	0	100.0	0.0	0.0
North Macedonia	4	2	2	0	5	3	50.0	50.0	0.0
Poland	4	3	1	0	7	3	75.0	25.0	0.0
San Marino	4	4	0	0	24	0	100.0	0.0	0.0
Scotland	4	3	1	0	11	5	75.0	25.0	0.0
United States	4	3	1	0	8	2	75.0	25.0	0.0
Argentina	3	2	1	0	4	2	66.7	33.3	0.0
Austria	3	2	1	0	4	2	66.7	33.3	0.0
Belgium	3	1	0	2	1	3	33.3	0.0	66.7
Czech Republic	3	1	1	1	8	4	33.3	33.3	33.3
Greece	3	2	1	0	8	2	66.7	33.3	0.0
Malta	3	3	0	0	8	1	100.0	0.0	0.0
Russia	3	1	1	1	5	3	33.3	33.3	33.3
Turkey	3	2	1	0	4	1	66.7	33.3	0.0
Albania	2	2	0	0	5	1	100.0	0.0	0.0
Australia	2	1	0	1	3	4	50.0	0.0	50.0
Azerbaijan	2	2	0	0	3	0	100.0	0.0	0.0
Belarus	2	2	0	0	6	1	100.0	0.0	0.0
Colombia	2	1	1	0	4	3	50.0	50.0	0.0
Costa Rica	2	1	1	0	2	0	50.0	50.0	0.0
Ecuador	2	1	1	0	3	2	50.0	50.0	0.0
Finland	2	1	1	0	2	1	50.0	50.0	0.0
Hungary	2	2	0	0	5	2	100.0	0.0	0.0
Iceland	2	1	0	1	7	3	50.0	0.0	50.0
Israel	2	1	1	0	3	0	50.0	50.0	0.0
Japan	2	1	1	0	3	2	50.0	50.0	0.0
Kazakhstan	2	2	0	0	9	1	100.0	0.0	0.0
Liechtenstein	2	2	0	0	4	0	100.0	0.0	0.0
Mexico	2	2	0	0	7	1	100.0	0.0	0.0
Moldova	2	2	0	0	9	0	100.0	0.0	0.0
Nigeria	2	1	1	0	2	1	50.0	50.0	0.0
Northern Ireland	2	1	0	1	4	1	50.0	0.0	50.0
Norway	2	2	0	0	2	0	100.0	0.0	0.0
Paraguay	2	2	0	0	5	0	100.0	0.0	0.0
Republic of Ireland	2	0	2	0	1	1	0.0	100.0	0.0
Trinidad and Tobago	2	2	0	0	5	0	100.0	0.0	0.0
Uruguay	2	1	0	1	3	3	50.0	0.0	50.0
Algeria	1	0	1	0	0	0	0.0	100.0	0.0
Cameroon	1	0	1	0	2	2	0.0	100.0	0.0
Chile	1	0	0	1	0	2	0.0	0.0	100.0
Egypt	1	1	0	0	3	1	100.0	0.0	0.0
Ghana	1	0	1	0	1	1	0.0	100.0	0.0
Honduras	1	0	1	0	0	0	0.0	100.0	0.0
Jamaica	1	1	0	0	6	0	100.0	0.0	0.0
Kosovo	1	1	0	0	5	3	100.0	0.0	0.0
Panama	1	1	0	0	6	1	100.0	0.0	0.0
Peru	1	1	0	0	3	0	100.0	0.0	0.0
Romania	1	0	0	1	2	3	0.0	0.0	100.0
Serbia	1	1	0	0	2	1	100.0	0.0	0.0
South Africa	1	1	0	0	2	1	100.0	0.0	0.0
South Korea	1	0	1	0	1	1	0.0	100.0	0.0
Tunisia	1	1	0	0	2	1	100.0	0.0	0.0
Total	236	137	57	42	455	199	58.1	24.2	17.8
