= 2013–14 Manchester United F.C. season =

English football club season

Manchester United
2013–14 season
- Co-chairmen: Joel and Avram Glazer
- Manager: David Moyes (until 22 April); Ryan Giggs (interim player-manager; from 22 April)
- Stadium: Old Trafford
- Premier League: 7th
- FA Cup: Third round
- League Cup: Semi-finals
- UEFA Champions League: Quarter-finals
- Community Shield: Winners
- Top goalscorer: League: Wayne Rooney (17); All: Wayne Rooney (19)
- Highest home attendance: 75,368 (vs. Aston Villa, 29 March)
- Lowest home attendance: 58,663 (vs. Norwich City, 29 October)
- Average home league attendance: 75,207
Home colours	Away colours	Third colours

The 2013–14 season was Manchester United's 22nd season in the Premier League, and their 39th consecutive season in the top-flight of English football.

David Moyes began the season as United's new manager after taking over from Sir Alex Ferguson, who retired after almost 27 years in charge. He had been announced as the club's new manager before the end of the previous season, but did not officially take over until 1 July 2013.

Despite winning the Community Shield, United were soon struggling in the league and endured some of their worst results since the end of the 1980s. In January, United were eliminated from the FA Cup at the first hurdle with a loss to Swansea City, as well as from the semi-finals of the League Cup after being beaten on penalties by Sunderland.

United fared better in Europe, topping their group in the group stage. They suffered a scare when they lost to Olympiacos in the first leg of the round of 16, but overcame the deficit in the second leg. United were ultimately eliminated during the quarter-finals in April, with defending champions Bayern Munich beating them 4–2 on aggregate.

On 22 April 2014, with four games remaining, Moyes was sacked as manager, less than a year into his six-year contract. His last game, two days earlier, had ended in 2–0 defeat at his former club Everton. 40-year-old player-coach Ryan Giggs was placed in charge for United's remaining games, from which they collected seven points. A seventh place in the league was United's lowest finish since 1990 and meant that they had missed out on European qualification for the first time since 1989–90 (when English clubs were still banned from European competitions due to the Heysel Stadium disaster of 1985). The last time outside the Heysel ban era that United had missed out on a place in Europe was in 1980–81.

Dutch coach Louis van Gaal was confirmed as Manchester United's new manager on a three-year contract on 19 May 2014, with Giggs appointed as his assistant. On the same day, Giggs announced his retirement as a player after a career spanning nearly 25 years, during which he had played almost 1,000 competitive games for the club and won 34 trophies.

== Background ==
It was a period of change for United's staff. In May 2013, manager Sir Alex Ferguson announced his retirement after 26 years of service, having just won his 13th Premier League title that season and United's 20th overall. Earlier in February 2013, it was made known that chief executive David Gill would be stepping down after 16 years of service, with 10 years as chief executive. Each announcement was accompanied with the naming of their successors, who would take over on 1 July 2013. David Moyes, aged 50, manager of Everton and a Scotsman like Ferguson, was appointed as the new United manager. Ed Woodward assumed the top executive role at United, although he retained the title of executive vice-chairman.

Moyes looked to appoint his own coaching staff as he started his reign. In May 2013, assistant manager Mike Phelan and goalkeeping coach Eric Steele left the club. First-team coach René Meulensteen followed a month later. All three had served in their respective positions since 2008, while Phelan and Meulensteen had worked in other roles at United since 2001. In their place, Moyes brought in staff from Everton to join him in July, appointing Steve Round as assistant manager, Chris Woods as goalkeeping coach and Jimmy Lumsden as coach. In July, veteran United winger Ryan Giggs became a player-coach, while former United and Everton player Phil Neville was also added to the coaching staff.

== Pre-season and friendlies ==
United preceded their 2013–14 campaign with a global tour of Asia, Australia and Europe, before returning to Old Trafford for Rio Ferdinand's testimonial match against Sevilla, marking the defender's 11 years with the club. United's pre-season saw them suffer three defeats in seven games, which was described as "poor" and "miserable". One of the defeats came against the Thai All-Star XI, which was David Moyes' first game in charge. By the time the pre-season ended, United were struggling off the pitch as well, having made no major signings at that point. Moyes admitted that the "transition from Everton to Manchester United has been difficult at times". Regarding the lack of major signings, Moyes pointed out that he "got the job on 1 July" and were on tour for the next three weeks, as well as the fact that "the level [he had] been shopping in the past [was] not the level Manchester United have been shopping in".

During this period, United had to battle to retain the services of their striker Wayne Rooney. Near the end of the previous season, weeks before Sir Alex Ferguson's announcement of retirement, Rooney was reported to have verbally asked to leave the club despite not handing in a transfer request. After Moyes took over, Rooney was left angered and confused by comments by Moyes which seemed to indicate that Rooney would be playing second fiddle to fellow striker Robin van Persie. Chelsea attempted to sign Rooney, with Chelsea manager José Mourinho openly declaring his high interest, but United insisted that Rooney was not for sale.

Date	Opponents	H / A	Result F–A	Scorers	Attendance
13 July 2013	Thai All-Star XI	N	0–1		60,000
20 July 2013	A-League All Stars	N	5–1	Lingard (2) 11', 55', Welbeck (2) 34', 70', Van Persie 87'	83,127
23 July 2013	Yokohama F. Marinos	A	2–3	Lingard 19', Tashiro 30' (o.g.)	66,372
26 July 2013	Cerezo Osaka	A	2–2	Kagawa 54', Zaha 90+1'	44,856
29 July 2013	Kitchee	N	5–2	Welbeck 16', Smalling 22', Fábio 26', Januzaj 50', Lingard 80'	40,000
6 August 2013	AIK	A	1–1	Henríquez 68'	30,012
9 August 2013	Sevilla	H	1–3	Valencia 64'	43,000

== FA Community Shield ==
As Premier League champions, United began the season against the holders of the FA Cup, Wigan Athletic in the Community Shield. The match, which was David Moyes' first competitive fixture in charge of Manchester United, was played at Wembley on 11 August. United ran out 2–0 winners due to two goals from Robin van Persie in a game where they played "with a sense of control" but failed to "emphasise the gulf between the two clubs more emphatically". This was United's (and Moyes') first silverware of the season. The Shield was ultimately Moyes' only honour as United manager.

Date	Opponents	H / A	Result F–A	Scorers	Attendance
11 August 2013	Wigan Athletic	N	2–0	Van Persie (2) 6', 59'	80,235

== Premier League ==
=== August and September ===
United faced a tough start to the 2013–14 league season; within the first five games in August and September, three were against Chelsea, Liverpool and Manchester City. After the fixtures were decided, manager David Moyes publicly questioned whether the draw was done fairly for the defending champions. Moyes' first league game in charge of Manchester United saw them visit Swansea City on 17 August. It was a bright start for United as they ran out 4–1 winners with doubles from Robin van Persie and Danny Welbeck, while substitute Wayne Rooney played a part in two goals. This put United at the top of the league, a height they would never replicate that season.

United's first home game of the season was against José Mourinho's Chelsea. They played out a stalemate for the first 0–0 game since 2009 at Old Trafford in 77 Premier League games. Rooney, who was being courted by Chelsea at the time, performed prominently and positively while receiving much support from the Old Trafford crowd. The club's next match saw an "error-prone and inhibited" United falling to fierce rivals Liverpool at Anfield for Moyes' first competitive loss. Liverpool led from the fourth minute through Daniel Sturridge and topped the table with their third consecutive 1–0 victory. United, though, were out of the top four, and they stayed out for the rest of the season. United had not failed to score in successive games in six years.

Following the international break, Moyes' first home win came against Crystal Palace on 14 September, during which Ashley Young was yellow carded for diving against Kagisho Dikgacoi, for which Moyes would criticise Young. In another controversial clash near the end of first half, Young this time earned a penalty and Dikgacoi was sent off. Van Persie converted and Rooney later scored from a free kick for a 2–0 win. Also, new signing Maroune Fellaini debuted as a substitute.

United then travelled across town to play a much anticipated fixture against local rivals Manchester City. City opened the scoring through Sergio Agüero in the 16th minute, then doubled their lead via Yaya Touré seconds before half-time. Any thoughts of a comeback for the visitors were dispersed soon after the restart, as Agüero grabbed his second and City's third in the 47th minute. Samir Nasri then added his own name to the scoresheet three minutes later to compound United's misery. Rooney managed to pull a goal back with a 25-yard free kick late on into the game, but it was merely consolation as United fell to their worst defeat at the Etihad Stadium in nine years.

On 28 September, Manchester United hosted West Bromwich Albion at Old Trafford. The visitors took the lead in the 54th minute through Morgan Amalfitano, but United responded quickly, levelling the scores with a Rooney free kick three minutes later. However, West Brom hit back immediately, with 20-year-old substitute Saido Berahino grabbing the winner as David Moyes' side slipped to their first home defeat of the season.

=== October and November ===
On a run of back-to-back Premier League defeats, United then travelled to the Stadium of Light to play against league strugglers Sunderland. Much to Moyes' dismay, it was once again the opposition who struck first, as Craig Gardner capitalised on Nemanja Vidić's error to put the hosts ahead. However, United fired back, as 18-year-old Adnan Januzaj scored twice on his first Premier League start, rescuing a valuable three points for the visitors.

The Red Devils then began a run of four consecutive home games at Old Trafford, beginning with a visit from high-flying Southampton, who boasted the best defensive record in the Premier League. Van Persie's 26th-minute strike looked to have set the hosts on course for a win, but the visitors equalised through a last gasp corner kick, with Dejan Lovren's header deflecting off of Adam Lallana to spoil United's celebrations.

The club then welcomed Stoke City to Old Trafford. Despite holding the worst goalscoring record in the Premier League, Stoke unexpectedly drew first blood through Peter Crouch in the third minute. Van Persie looked to have levelled proceedings heading into half-time with a 43rd-minute strike, but the visitors soon regained their lead seconds before the break, this time through a Marko Arnautović free kick. With the game entering its final 15 minutes, United finally found their equaliser as Rooney headed in Van Persie's corner kick, and less than two minutes later, substitute Javier Hernández completed the comeback as he nodded in Patrice Evra's cross.

On 2 November, Manchester United visited Fulham at Craven Cottage. United began brightly, as Rooney set up Antonio Valencia for the game's opener in the ninth minute, and cemented their lead a few minutes later after two quick-fire goals from Van Persie and Rooney. Alexander Kačaniklić's heavily deflected shot pulled one back for the hosts in the 65th minute, but it was not enough in the end to prevent David Moyes' side from taking the three points, as his team won two consecutive league games for the first time all season.

United then clashed with rivals and league leaders Arsenal at Old Trafford. Van Persie, who had left the Gunners to join United the previous season, once again struck against his former side after his header found the back of the net in the 27th minute. Despite the visitors looking largely dominant possession wise throughout the match, solid defending from the hosts were enough to see through a win, as United recorded a memorable victory over Arsène Wenger's in-form men.

David Moyes' men then returned to South Wales, as they were presented with the opportunity to extend their impressive domestic run against Cardiff City at the Cardiff City Stadium. Rooney put the visitors ahead with just 15 minutes played, and after former Manchester United teammate Fraizer Campbell equalised for the home side, he set up Evra's header to restore the lead just before the break. However, United were once again unravelled by a last gasp set-piece, as substitute Kim Bo-kyung nodded in a free-kick to salvage a draw for the Welsh side.

=== December and January ===
United's next game was away against Tottenham Hotspur at White Hart Lane. Kyle Walker fired the hosts into an early lead with a close-range free kick in the 18th minute, but man of the moment Wayne Rooney pounced to equalise for United moments later. However, André Villas-Boas' men raced into the lead once again after the restart, this time through a Sandro rocket from 25 yards out, forcing the visitors to come from behind a second time through a Rooney penalty kick.

The following two matches at home ended with 1–0 losses against Everton and Newcastle United (both of whom ended long runs without wins at Old Trafford). Those losses meant United were winless in the last four games with only two points collected from a possible 12. United then won four matches in a row, which included win at Aston Villa, Hull City and Norwich City alongside a win at home against West Ham United.

United started off 2014 by losing a fourth home league match in a 2–1 defeat to Tottenham Hotspur, leaving them down in seventh. After bowing out of the FA Cup to Swansea City the week before, a much-improved second half display against them at Old Trafford saw United come out on top. Antonio Valencia opened the scoring with a tap-in before Danny Welbeck flicked in the second from Patrice Evra's shot.

But the high was short-lived as a defensive horror show meant the Reds left Stamford Bridge with no points. Samuel Eto'o scored a hat-trick and Javier Hernández scored a consolation before Nemanja Vidić was sent off. But United made it back-to-back home wins for the first time since November as new signing Juan Mata helped them see off Ole Gunnar Solskjær's Cardiff City. Robin van Persie returned to score before Ashley Young fired in to seal the points.

=== February and March ===
But again United did not follow it up with a win. A Michael Carrick own goal put them behind at Stoke City before Robin van Persie converted from Juan Mata's pass. A screamer from Charlie Adam, however, meant United returned from Staffordshire empty-handed.

United also fell behind in their next game against bottom-side Fulham. Steve Sidwell shocked Old Trafford as United piled forward in search of the win. Mata's cross for fired in by Van Persie, and minutes later Carrick scored his first goal of the season with a neat finish from the edge of the box. Darren Bent's injury-time goal, however, meant United dropped two vital points again.

United played well to come away from the Emirates with a 0–0 draw, denying Arsenal for the second time this season. Van Persie had two great chances to score but was denied by Arsenal keeper Wojciech Szczęsny. United got back to winning ways with a comfortable victory at Crystal Palace. Van Persie converted a penalty after Patrice Evra was fouled, before Wayne Rooney expertly volleyed in to seal the win.

United's third away game in succession saw them travel to the ground where Alex Ferguson bowed out of the Premier League, at The Hawthorns against West Bromwich Albion. United eased to a 3–0 victory; Phil Jones headed in Van Persie's dangerous free kick just before half time, a sweeping move ended with Rooney heading in Rafael's right-wing cross and substitute Welbeck expertly finished off another fine move as United finally delivered a good performance.

United returned to Old Trafford up against an in-form Liverpool. After a tight first-half, Steven Gerrard gave the visitors the lead from the penalty spot after Rafael committed a handball in the area. The Liverpool then captain added a second penalty after a foul by Phil Jones seconds just into the second-half. After United were denied a penalty of their own, the Merseyside club were awarded a third penalty which also saw United captain Nemanja Vidić sent off. Replays suggested Daniel Sturridge actually dived, but nonetheless Gerrard missed the kick. Luis Suárez completed the scoring after a neat attack.

United got back to winning ways with a comfortable 2–0 away win at West Ham. Wayne Rooney opened the scoring with a half-volley from just inside the West Ham half, reminiscent of David Beckham's goal against Wimbledon in 1996. The England striker then added his second after Mark Noble failed to clear Ashley Young's cross.

Another poor performance saw United slip to another costly derby defeat, this time to neighbours Manchester City in the 150th Manchester Derby. Edin Džeko finished off a rebound to give City the lead after just 47 seconds. The City striker later volleyed in number two in the second-half, before Yaya Touré completed the rout in added time.

On 29 March 2014, a flypast was staged by a portion of United fans with the banner displaying "Wrong One - Moyes Out" during a match against Aston Villa at Old Trafford. After the match, which United won 4–1, Moyes claimed that the majority of fans had been "very supportive" of him.

=== April and May ===
Despite that comment, and a 4–0 win over Newcastle United, the club fired Moyes less than a month later on 22 April, shortly after United lost 2–0 to Moyes' old club Everton at Goodison Park. The result ended any hope of them making the Champions League, and when combined with Tottenham Hotspur winning their own match the previous day, left United needing to take near-maximum points from their remaining games to even achieve a Europa League spot.

Ryan Giggs took over as interim player-manager for the final four games. His first game as manager was a 4–0 thrashing of Norwich City at Old Trafford, with Wayne Rooney and Juan Mata each scoring a pair. However, the next match resulted in a surprise 1–0 defeat to strugglers Sunderland, a result which ultimately proved a fatal blow to United's slim Europa League hopes. This was followed by a 3–1 win over Hull City in the club's final home match of the season, and Giggs's farewell game at Old Trafford.

The final day saw United playing away at Southampton, needing a victory and for Spurs to lose against Aston Villa in order to take sixth place. Ultimately, neither result went United's way, as they only managed to draw while Spurs won. This meant that for the first time since the 1989–90 season (or the 1980–81 season, if the seasons when English clubs were barred from European competition in the aftermath of the Heysel Disaster are not counted), the club had failed to qualify for any form of European football whatsoever.

=== Aftermath ===
In September 2014, executive vice-chairman Ed Woodward participated in a conference call to investors, discussing the results for the financial year that ended on 30 June 2014. Woodward described the 2013–14 season as "challenging and disappointing." He announced a record annual revenue of £433.2 million, a rise of 19 per cent, which was in part due to a new shirt manufacturing deal with Adidas. However, the club's annual profit fell by 84 per cent to £23.8 million, which BBC Sport analysed was "largely due to United's owners cashing in a tax credit in the previous financial year." It was also revealed that the club had paid former manager David Moyes and his staff £5.2 million following their exits, while their seventh-placed finish in the Premier League reduced their prize money by £7.4 million. BBC Sport also predicted that the total cost for missing out on the Champions League will end up at more than £50 million. Lastly, the club budgeted for a third-place Premier League finish for the 2014–15 season.

=== Results ===
Date	Opponents	H / A	Result F–A	Scorers	Attendance	League position
17 August 2013	Swansea City	A	4–1	Van Persie (2) 34', 72', Welbeck (2) 36', 90+2'	20,733	1st
26 August 2013	Chelsea	H	0–0		75,032	4th
1 September 2013	Liverpool	A	0–1		44,411	7th
14 September 2013	Crystal Palace	H	2–0	Van Persie 45+1' (pen.), Rooney 81'	75,170	5th
22 September 2013	Manchester City	A	1–4	Rooney 87'	47,156	8th
28 September 2013	West Bromwich Albion	H	1–2	Rooney 57'	75,042	12th
5 October 2013	Sunderland	A	2–1	Januzaj (2) 55', 61'	45,426	9th
19 October 2013	Southampton	H	1–1	Van Persie 26'	75,220	8th
26 October 2013	Stoke City	H	3–2	Van Persie 43', Rooney 78', Hernández 80'	75,274	8th
2 November 2013	Fulham	A	3–1	Valencia 9', Van Persie 20', Rooney 22'	25,700	8th
10 November 2013	Arsenal	H	1–0	Van Persie 27'	75,138	5th
24 November 2013	Cardiff City	A	2–2	Rooney 15', Evra 45'	28,016	6th
1 December 2013	Tottenham Hotspur	A	2–2	Rooney (2) 32', 57' (pen.)	35,884	8th
4 December 2013	Everton	H	0–1		75,210	9th
7 December 2013	Newcastle United	H	0–1		75,233	9th
15 December 2013	Aston Villa	A	3–0	Welbeck (2) 15', 18', Cleverley 52'	42,682	8th
21 December 2013	West Ham United	H	3–1	Welbeck 26', Januzaj 36', Young 72'	75,350	7th
26 December 2013	Hull City	A	3–2	Smalling 19', Rooney 26', Chester 66' (o.g.)	24,826	7th
28 December 2013	Norwich City	A	1–0	Welbeck 57'	26,851	6th
1 January 2014	Tottenham Hotspur	H	1–2	Welbeck 67'	75,265	7th
11 January 2014	Swansea City	H	2–0	Valencia 47', Welbeck 59'	75,035	7th
19 January 2014	Chelsea	A	1–3	Hernández 78'	41,465	7th
28 January 2014	Cardiff City	H	2–0	Van Persie 6', Young 59'	75,301	7th
1 February 2014	Stoke City	A	1–2	Van Persie 47'	26,547	7th
9 February 2014	Fulham	H	2–2	Van Persie 78', Carrick 80'	74,966	7th
12 February 2014	Arsenal	A	0–0		60,021	7th
22 February 2014	Crystal Palace	A	2–0	Van Persie 62' (pen.), Rooney 68'	24,571	7th
8 March 2014	West Bromwich Albion	A	3–0	Jones 34', Rooney 65', Welbeck 82'	26,184	6th
16 March 2014	Liverpool	H	0–3		75,225	7th
22 March 2014	West Ham United	A	2–0	Rooney (2) 8', 33'	34,237	7th
25 March 2014	Manchester City	H	0–3		75,203	7th
29 March 2014	Aston Villa	H	4–1	Rooney (2) 20', 45' (pen.), Mata 57', Hernández 90+1'	75,368	7th
5 April 2014	Newcastle United	A	4–0	Mata (2) 39', 50', Hernández 64', Januzaj 90+3'	52,081	6th
20 April 2014	Everton	A	0–2		39,436	7th
26 April 2014	Norwich City	H	4–0	Rooney (2) 41' (pen.), 48', Mata (2) 63', 73'	75,208	7th
3 May 2014	Sunderland	H	0–1		75,347	7th
6 May 2014	Hull City	H	3–1	Wilson (2) 31', 61', Van Persie 86'	75,341	7th
11 May 2014	Southampton	A	1–1	Mata 54'	31,372	7th

=== Table ===
Pos	Team	Pld	W	D	L	GF	GA	GD	Pts	Qualification or relegation
5	Everton	38	21	9	8	61	39	+22	72	Qualification for the Europa League group stage
6	Tottenham Hotspur	38	21	6	11	55	51	+4	69	Qualification for the Europa League play-off round (Note: Since the winners of 2013–14 Football League Cup (Manchester City) qualified for the Champions League, the spot awarded to them (Europa League play-off round) was passed to the 6th-placed team.)
7	Manchester United	38	19	7	12	64	43	+21	64	
8	Southampton	38	15	11	12	54	46	+8	56	
9	Stoke City	38	13	11	14	45	52	−7	50	

Source: Barclays Premier League
Rules for classification: 1) Points; 2) Goal difference; 3) Goals scored; 4) Play-offs (only if needed to decide champion, teams for relegation or teams for UEFA competitions).

== FA Cup ==
United entered the FA Cup at the Third Round stage with the other Premier League clubs, as well as those from the Championship. The draw was made on 8 December 2013, which saw United drawn at home to fellow Premier League club Swansea City. The tie took place on 5 January 2014. The Swans won for the first time at Old Trafford resulting in United exiting from the competition.

Date	Round	Opponents	H / A	Result F–A	Scorers	Attendance
5 January 2014	Round 3	Swansea City	H	1–2	Hernández 16'	73,910

== League Cup ==
As one of seven English clubs who qualified for European competition in the 2012–13 season, United received a bye to the Third Round of the League Cup. The draw took place on 28 August 2013, with United being paired with fellow Premier League club Liverpool. It is the fourth time overall the two rivals have met in the competition and the first time since the 2003 final, where Liverpool ran out 2–0 winners. The game was played on 25 September 2013 in Old Trafford, with United winning thanks to a goal by Javier Hernández in the 46th minute after a corner kick by Rooney. After the game United were drawn to play against Norwich City on 29 October at home, which United won 4–0. The draw for the Fifth Round took place on 30 October 2013, with United being paired with fellow Premier League club Stoke City at the Britannia Stadium. The game was played on 18 December 2013, with United winning 2–0. The draw for the Semi-finals took place on 18 December 2013, with United being paired with fellow Premier League club Sunderland. They lost the first leg of the tie 2–1 at the Stadium of Light. In the return leg at Old Trafford, they were leading 1–0 at the end of 90 minutes and the tie went to extra time. Both teams scored late goals at the end of extra time, meaning that the two sides were exactly level over the two legs. In the resulting penalty shoot-out, Adnan Januzaj, Danny Welbeck, Phil Jones and Rafael all missed their kicks; only Darren Fletcher scored, while Sunderland scored two of their own, putting United out of the competition.

Date	Round	Opponents	H / A	Result F–A	Scorers	Attendance
25 September 2013	Round 3	Liverpool	H	1–0	Hernández 46'	65,701
29 October 2013	Round 4	Norwich City	H	4–0	Hernández (2) 20' (pen.), 54', Jones 88', Fábio 90+5'	58,663
18 December 2013	Round 5	Stoke City	A	2–0	Young 62', Evra 78'	25,928
7 January 2014	Semi-final; First leg	Sunderland	A	1–2	Vidić 51'	31,547
22 January 2014	Semi-final; Second leg	Sunderland	H	2–1 (a.e.t.) (1–2p)	Evans 37', Hernández 120+1'	71,019

== UEFA Champions League ==
=== Group stage ===
Having finished in the top three in the league last season, United began their Champions League campaign in the group stage. Courtesy of their UEFA coefficient, they were seeded in Pot 1 for the draw, which took place in Monaco on 29 August 2013. United were drawn into Group A, along with Ukrainian champions Shakhtar Donetsk, Bayer Leverkusen from Germany, and Real Sociedad from Spain. Manchester United were previously drawn with Bayer Leverkusen in both 2001–02 and 2002–03, while Shakhtar Donetsk and Real Sociedad were new opponents.

United's first UEFA Champions League group game was at home against Bayer Leverkusen on 17 September 2013, which ended in a 4–2 win after Rooney double and a strike apiece from Robin van Persie and Antonio Valencia. The game marked Moyes' first UEFA Champions League group stage game and Rooney's 200th goal in all competitions for United.

Date	Opponents	H / A	Result F–A	Scorers	Attendance	Group position
17 September 2013	Bayer Leverkusen	H	4–2	Rooney (2) 22', 70', Van Persie 59', Valencia 79'	74,000	1st
2 October 2013	Shakhtar Donetsk	A	1–1	Welbeck 18'	51,555	1st
23 October 2013	Real Sociedad	H	1–0	I. Martínez 2' (o.g.)	74,654	1st
5 November 2013	Real Sociedad	A	0–0		30,998	1st
27 November 2013	Bayer Leverkusen	A	5–0	Valencia 22', Spahić 30' (o.g.), Evans 66', Smalling 77', Nani 88'	29,412	1st
10 December 2013	Shakhtar Donetsk	H	1–0	Jones 67'	74,506	1st

Pos	Team	Pld	W	D	L	GF	GA	GD	Pts	Qualification	MUN	LEV	SHK	RSO
1	(England) Manchester United	6	4	2	0	12	3	+9	14	Advance to knockout phase	—	4–2	1–0	1–0
2	(Germany) Bayer Leverkusen	6	3	1	2	9	10	−1	10	Advance to knockout phase	0–5	—	4–0	2–1
3	(Ukraine) Shakhtar Donetsk	6	2	2	2	7	6	+1	8	Transfer to Europa League	1–1	0–0	—	4–0
4	(Spain) Real Sociedad	6	0	1	5	1	10	−9	1		0–0	0–1	0–2	—

Source: UEFA

=== Knockout phase ===
The draw for the round of 16 was made in Nyon, Switzerland, on 16 December 2013. The first leg was played on 25 February 2014 away from home, and the second leg was played on 19 March 2014 at Old Trafford. As winners of their group, United were drawn against Greek league champions, Olympiacos, who finished as runners-up in Group C. It was the fifth tie between the two clubs and the first time they had faced one another since 2002 when United won 3–2 in the First group round. United lost the first leg 2–0 in Greece, but came back to win 3–0 in the return leg thanks to a Robin van Persie hat-trick. The 3–2 aggregate win sent United into the quarter-finals to face title-holders Bayern Munich. In the first leg at Old Trafford, United were comprehensively outplayed by Bayern, yet they took the lead through Vidić and eventually finished with a 1–1 draw. Despite again taking a 1–0 lead in Germany, they capitulated after the goal and lost 3–1, thus being eliminated 4–2 on aggregate.

Date	Round	Opponents	H / A	Result F–A	Scorers	Attendance
25 February 2014	Round of 16; First leg	Olympiacos	A	0–2		29,815
19 March 2014	Round of 16; Second leg	Olympiacos	H	3–0	Van Persie 25' (pen.), 45+1', 51'	74,662
1 April 2014	Quarter-final; First leg	Bayern Munich	H	1–1	Vidić 58'	75,199
9 April 2014	Quarter-final; Second leg	Bayern Munich	A	1–3	Evra 57'	67,300

== Squad statistics ==
No.	Pos.	Name	League		FA Cup		League Cup		Europe		Other		Total		Discipline	
No.	Pos.	Name	Apps	Goals	Apps	Goals	Apps	Goals	Apps	Goals	Apps	Goals	Apps	Goals	Yellow card	Red card
1	GK	(Spain) David de Gea	37	0	0	0	4	0	10	0	1	0	52	0	1	0
2	DF	(Brazil) Rafael	18(1)	0	0	0	5	0	4	0	1	0	28(1)	0	6	0
3	DF	(France) Patrice Evra	33	1	0	0	2(1)	1	8	1	1	0	44(1)	3	6	0
4	DF	(England) Phil Jones	26	1	0	0	3(1)	1	6(2)	1	1	0	36(3)	3	8	0
5	DF	(England) Rio Ferdinand	12(2)	0	1	0	1	0	7	0	0	0	21(2)	0	2	0
6	DF	(Northern Ireland) Jonny Evans	17	0	1	0	4	1	3	1	0	0	25	2	0	0
8	MF	(Brazil) Anderson	2(2)	0	0	0	1(1)	0	0(1)	0	0(1)	0	3(5)	0	0	0
8	MF	(Spain) Juan Mata	14(1)	6	0	0	0	0	0	0	0	0	14(1)	6	0	0
10	FW	(England) Wayne Rooney	27(2)	17	0	0	1(1)	0	9	2	0	0	37(3)	19	8	0
11	MF	(Wales) Ryan Giggs	6(6)	0	0	0	2	0	6(1)	0	1	0	15(7)	0	4	0
12	DF	(England) Chris Smalling	21(4)	1	1	0	3(1)	0	6(1)	1	0(1)	0	31(7)	2	3	0
13	GK	(Denmark) Anders Lindegaard	1	0	1	0	1	0	0	0	0	0	3	0	0	0
14	FW	(Mexico) Javier Hernández	6(18)	4	1	1	3(2)	4	2(3)	0	0	0	12(23)	9	2	0
15	DF	(Serbia) Nemanja Vidić (c)	23(2)	0	0	0	2	1	6	1	1	0	32(2)	2	6	2
16	MF	(England) Michael Carrick	26(3)	1	0	0	2(1)	0	7	0	1	0	36(4)	1	6	0
17	MF	(Portugal) Nani	7(4)	0	0	0	1	0	1	1	0	0	9(4)	1	0	0
18	MF	(England) Ashley Young	13(7)	2	0	0	2	1	2(6)	0	0	0	17(13)	3	5	0
19	FW	(England) Danny Welbeck	15(10)	9	1	0	3(1)	0	4(1)	1	1	0	24(12)	10	2	0
20	FW	(Netherlands) Robin van Persie	18(3)	12	0	0	0	0	4(2)	4	1	2	23(5)	18	3	0
21	FW	(Chile) Ángelo Henríquez	0	0	0	0	0	0	0	0	0	0	0	0	0	0
22	DF	(Brazil) Fábio	1	0	0(1)	0	0(1)	1	0	0	0	0	1(2)	1	0	1
23	MF	(England) Tom Cleverley	18(4)	1	1	0	3	0	2(2)	0	1	0	25(6)	1	5	0
24	MF	(Scotland) Darren Fletcher	9(3)	0	1	0	1(2)	0	1(1)	0	0	0	12(6)	0	0	0
25	MF	(Ecuador) Antonio Valencia	20(9)	2	1	0	2(1)	0	9(1)	2	0(1)	0	32(12)	4	7	1
26	MF	(Japan) Shinji Kagawa	14(4)	0	1	0	2	0	6(2)	0	0(1)	0	23(7)	0	1	0
27	FW	(Italy) Federico Macheda	0	0	0	0	0	0	0	0	0	0	0	0	0	0
28	DF	(Netherlands) Alexander Büttner	5(3)	0	1	0	3	0	2(1)	0	0	0	11(4)	0	3	0
29	FW	(England) Wilfried Zaha	0(2)	0	0	0	1	0	0	0	1	0	2(2)	0	0	0
30	DF	(Uruguay) Guillermo Varela	0	0	0	0	0	0	0	0	0	0	0	0	0	0
31	MF	(Belgium) Marouane Fellaini	12(4)	0	0	0	0	0	4(1)	0	0	0	16(5)	0	3	1
32	MF	(England) Nick Powell	0	0	0	0	0	0	0	0	0	0	0	0	0	0
33	FW	(Portugal) Bebé	0	0	0	0	0	0	0	0	0	0	0	0	0	0
34	MF	(Wales) Tom Lawrence	1	0	0	0	0	0	0	0	0	0	1	0	0	0
35	MF	(England) Jesse Lingard	0	0	0	0	0	0	0	0	0	0	0	0	0	0
36	DF	(Belgium) Marnick Vermijl	0	0	0	0	0	0	0	0	0	0	0	0	0	0
38	DF	(England) Michael Keane	0	0	0	0	0	0	0	0	0	0	0	0	0	0
39	DF	(England) Tom Thorpe	0	0	0	0	0	0	0	0	0	0	0	0	0	0
40	GK	(England) Ben Amos	0	0	0	0	0	0	0	0	0	0	0	0	0	0
42	DF	(England) Tyler Blackett	0	0	0	0	0	0	0	0	0	0	0	0	0	0
44	MF	(Belgium) Adnan Januzaj	15(12)	4	0(1)	0	3(1)	0	1(1)	0	0(1)	0	19(16)	4	8	0
45	MF	(Italy) Davide Petrucci	0	0	0	0	0	0	0	0	0	0	0	0	0	0
47	FW	(England) James Wilson	1	2	0	0	0	0	0	0	0	0	1	2	0	0
48	FW	(England) Will Keane	0	0	0	0	0	0	0	0	0	0	0	0	0	0
50	GK	(England) Sam Johnstone	0	0	0	0	0	0	0	0	0	0	0	0	0	0
Own goals			–	1	–	0	–	0	–	2	–	0	–	3	–	–

== Transfers ==
Manchester United began to make changes to their squad on in June 2013. On 7 June, it was announced that United would be releasing eight players in addition to Paul Scholes, who had retired at the end of the previous season. Also on the same day, 20-year-old Uruguayan right-back Guillermo Varela became David Moyes's first signing as Manchester United manager. These transfers came into effect upon the opening of the summer transfer window on 1 July. United went on to sell youngster Mats Møller Dæhli to Molde FK and 21-year-old Scott Wootton to Leeds United during the window. Meanwhile, Chelsea made two bids of £20 million and £25 million to sign United's Wayne Rooney in July and August, but United rejected the bids.

During the summer transfer window, Moyes attempted to sign players from his former club Everton. In June, Everton rejected a £12 million bid by United for English defender Leighton Baines. By July, United failed in two attempts to sign Barcelona midfielder Cesc Fàbregas for over £25 million. In August, Everton rejected another bid by United, a £28 million joint bid for Baines and Belgian midfielder Marouane Fellaini, describing it as "insulting." United ultimately managed to make 25-year-old Fellaini their first major signing of the season on transfer deadline day on 2 September for £27.5 million. On that day, United also signed 17-year-old Swiss defender Saidy Janko from Zürich, while abandoning their attempt to sign midfielder Ander Herrera from Athletic Bilbao. A late loan move for defender Fábio Coentrão from Real Madrid also fell through. During the transfer window, Real Madrid also rejected a £33.9 million bid from United for midfielder Sami Khedira.

United's failure to sign several major targets during the summer transfer window, as well as their actions on transfer deadline day, were labelled as a farce. BBC Sport described the "scramble to get [Fellaini's] deal ... over the line moments before the transfer window closed symbolised the confusion in a summer when a clear transfer strategy was conspicuously absent from Old Trafford." It was pointed out that Fellaini had a £23.5 million release clause that expired at the end of July, and that he ultimately cost only £0.5 million less than what United bid jointly for both Fellaini and Baines in August. Meanwhile, the Spanish professional football league said that three lawyers had unsuccessfully negotiated to sign Ander Herrera for United, but United denied sending anyone to the league's offices.

=== In ===
Date	Pos.	Name	From	Fee
1 July 2013	DF	(Uruguay) Guillermo Varela	(Uruguay) Peñarol	Undisclosed
2 September 2013	MF	(Belgium) Marouane Fellaini	(England) Everton	£27.5m
2 September 2013	DF	(Switzerland) Saidy Janko	(Switzerland) Zürich	Undisclosed
25 January 2014	MF	(Spain) Juan Mata	(England) Chelsea	£37.1m

=== Out ===
Date	Pos.	Name	To	Fee
1 July 2013	DF	(England) Reece Brown	Released	
1 July 2013	FW	(England) John Cofie	Released	
1 July 2013	DF	(Italy) Michele Fornasier	Released	
1 July 2013	MF	(England) Luke Giverin	Released	
1 July 2013	MF	(England) Luke Hendrie	Released	
1 July 2013	DF	(Northern Ireland) Luke McCullough	Released	
1 July 2013	FW	(Netherlands) Gyliano van Velzen	Released	
1 July 2013	DF	(Switzerland) Frédéric Veseli	Released	
4 July 2013	MF	(Norway) Mats Møller Dæhli	(Norway) Molde	Undisclosed
20 August 2013	DF	(England) Scott Wootton	(England) Leeds United	Undisclosed
31 January 2014	DF	(Brazil) Fábio	(Wales) Cardiff City	Undisclosed
31 January 2014	MF	(England) Ryan Tunnicliffe	(England) Fulham	Undisclosed
31 January 2014	MF	(England) Larnell Cole	(England) Fulham	Undisclosed
19 May 2014	MF	(Wales) Ryan Giggs	Retired	

=== Loan out ===
Date from	Date to	Pos.	Name	To
15 July 2013	24 September 2013	MF	(England) Reece James	(England) Carlisle United
26 July 2013	1 February 2014	MF	(England) Ryan Tunnicliffe	(England) Ipswich Town
17 August 2013	17 November 2013	GK	(England) Sam Johnstone	(England) Yeovil Town
28 August 2013	30 June 2014	FW	(Chile) Ángelo Henríquez	(Spain) Real Zaragoza
2 September 2013	30 June 2014	MF	(England) Nick Powell	(England) Wigan Athletic
2 September 2013	30 June 2014	FW	(Portugal) Bébé	(Portugal) Paços de Ferreira
2 September 2013	30 June 2014	MF	(Italy) Davide Petrucci	(Belgium) Royal Antwerp
2 September 2013	30 June 2014	DF	(Belgium) Marnick Vermijl	(Netherlands) N.E.C. Nijmegen
16 September 2013	8 October 2013	FW	(Italy) Federico Macheda	(England) Doncaster Rovers
19 September 2013	1 January 2014	MF	(England) Jesse Lingard	(England) Birmingham City
1 November 2013	1 January 2014	DF	(England) Tyler Blackett	(England) Blackpool
15 November 2013	1 January 2014	GK	(England) Ben Amos	(England) Carlisle United
21 November 2013	31 December 2013	FW	(Italy) Federico Macheda	(England) Doncaster Rovers
28 November 2013	1 February 2014	DF	(England) Michael Keane	(England) Derby County
28 November 2013	31 January 2014	FW	(Wales) Tom Lawrence	(England) Carlisle United
28 November 2013	1 January 2014	FW	(England) Will Keane	(England) Wigan Athletic
18 January 2014	30 June 2014	MF	(Brazil) Anderson	(Italy) Fiorentina
23 January 2014	25 March 2014	MF	(England) Jack Barmby	(England) Hartlepool United
31 January 2014	30 June 2014	FW	(England) Wilfried Zaha	(Wales) Cardiff City
31 January 2014	30 June 2014	MF	(Belgium) Charni Ekangamene	(England) Carlisle United
31 January 2014	30 June 2014	FW	(Republic of Ireland) Sam Byrne	(England) Carlisle United
31 January 2014	3 March 2014	DF	(England) Tom Thorpe	(England) Birmingham City
31 January 2014	30 June 2014	DF	(England) Tyler Blackett	(England) Birmingham City
31 January 2014	30 June 2014	FW	(Italy) Federico Macheda	(England) Birmingham City
31 January 2014	30 June 2014	FW	(Wales) Tom Lawrence	(England) Yeovil Town
31 January 2014	30 June 2014	GK	(England) Sam Johnstone	(England) Doncaster Rovers
31 January 2014	30 June 2014	FW	(England) Will Keane	(England) Queens Park Rangers
31 January 2014	28 February 2014	MF	(England) Jack Rudge	(England) Torquay United
27 February 2014	30 June 2014	MF	(England) Jesse Lingard	(England) Brighton & Hove Albion
