= Wilfried Zaha =

Ivorian footballer (born 1992)

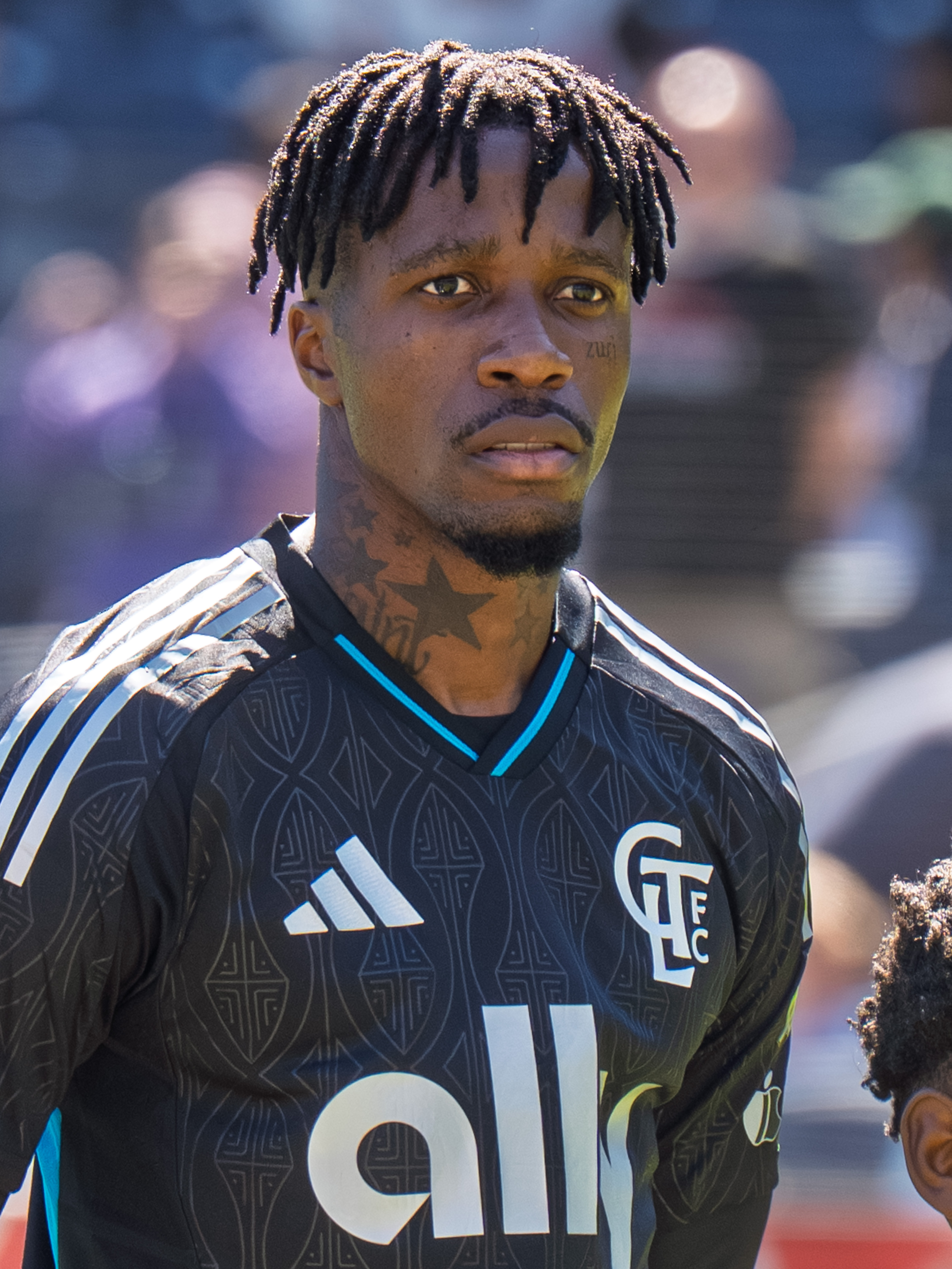
- Zaha in 2025

Personal information
- Full name: Dazet Wilfried Armel Zaha
- Date of birth: 10 November 1992 (age 34)
- Place of birth: Abidjan, Ivory Coast
- Height: 6 ft 0 in (1.82 m)
- Position: Winger

Youth career
- 2000–2010: Crystal Palace

Senior career*
Years	Team	Apps	(Gls)
2010–2013	Crystal Palace	110	(12)
2013–2015	Manchester United	2	(0)
2013	→ Crystal Palace (loan)	16	(1)
2014	→ Cardiff City (loan)	12	(0)
2014–2015	→ Crystal Palace (loan)	16	(1)
2015–2023	Crystal Palace	275	(67)
2023–2026	Galatasaray	30	(9)
2024–2025	→ Lyon (loan)	4	(0)
2025–2026	→ Charlotte FC (loan)	44	(13)

International career^{‡}
2011	England U19	2	(0)
2012–2013	England U21	13	(2)
2012–2013	England	2	(0)
2017–	Ivory Coast	36	(5)
- * Club domestic league appearances and goals as of 03:05, 24 May 2026 (UTC) ‡ National team caps and goals as of 23:09, 31 December 2025 (UTC)

Dazet Wilfried Armel Zaha (born 10 November 1992) is a Ivorian professional footballer who plays as a winger for the Ivory Coast national team.

A product of Crystal Palace's youth academy, Zaha made his senior debut for the then Championship, now Premier League, side in 2010. He scored 18 goals in 143 appearances in just over three seasons with the club, and was instrumental in their promotion to the Premier League in 2013. He subsequently joined Manchester United for £10 million, becoming Alex Ferguson's last signing for the club, and won the Community Shield on his debut.

Having made just four appearances in his only season in Manchester and enduring a brief loan spell at Cardiff City, Zaha returned to Crystal Palace in 2014. He went on to score 72 goals in 315 appearances for the club over the next nine seasons, becoming the club's tenth-highest all-time goalscorer, and their highest ever goalscorer in the Premier League, helping to establish the club in the top-flight before his departure in 2023.

Born in the Ivory Coast, Zaha grew up in England. He made his debut for the England national team in 2012, appearing in two non-competitive matches (the latter of which came in 2013). After not playing for England for four years, he switched to play for Ivory Coast in 2016, and represented the nation at the Africa Cup of Nations in 2017, 2019, 2021 and 2025.

== Early life ==
Born in Abidjan, Ivory Coast, Zaha moved with his family – including his eight siblings – to Thornton Heath in the London Borough of Croydon, at age four. He was educated at Whitehorse Manor Junior School, Thornton Heath and Selsdon High School, Selsdon.

He played football at school, and joined the Crystal Palace academy aged 8.

== Club career ==
=== Crystal Palace ===
==== 2009–10 season ====
Zaha was given his Crystal Palace first-team debut at home to Cardiff City on 27 March 2010 by caretaker manager Paul Hart as a substitute for Stern John with 10 minutes remaining in the 2–1 loss. He signed a two-year professional contract with Palace in April.

==== 2010–11 season ====
He quickly progressed through the ranks at Palace and became a key member of the first team during the 2010–11 pre-season friendlies. On 7 August 2010, he scored his first senior goal in a 3–2 win over Leicester City. Zaha assisted Kieron Cadogan in the home match against Queens Park Rangers in October and James Vaughan in the away match against Watford in February 2011. On 12 April 2011, he was sent off in the 95th minute against Leicester City for an alleged stamp on Patrick van Aanholt but it was later rescinded. Zaha ended the season playing a total of 44 matches, while scoring 1 goal and having 2 assists in all competitions.

==== 2011–12 season ====
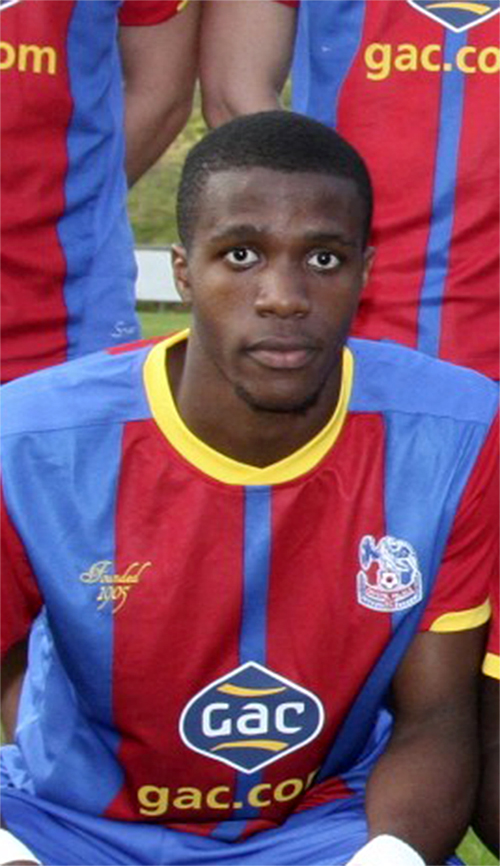
Zaha with Crystal Palace in 2012

Zaha started the 2011–12 season by scoring two goals in a League Cup match on 23 August 2011 at home to Crawley Town. On 30 November, Zaha impressed in Crystal Palace's 2–1 shock win over Manchester United in the League Cup, constantly sneaking through the United defence and in January, attracting interest from Liverpool and Manchester United.

In March 2012, Zaha was voted The Football League's Young Player of the Year.

In the latter part of the season, manager Dougie Freedman opted to play Zaha as a striker and on 21 April he scored in a 2–2 draw with Reading, in a match that saw Reading secure the Championship title. At the end of the 2011–12 season, Zaha was voted Crystal Palace Young Player of the Year for a second time in a row. During this season, he made 48 appearances while scoring 9 goals and recording 5 assists.

==== 2012–13 season ====
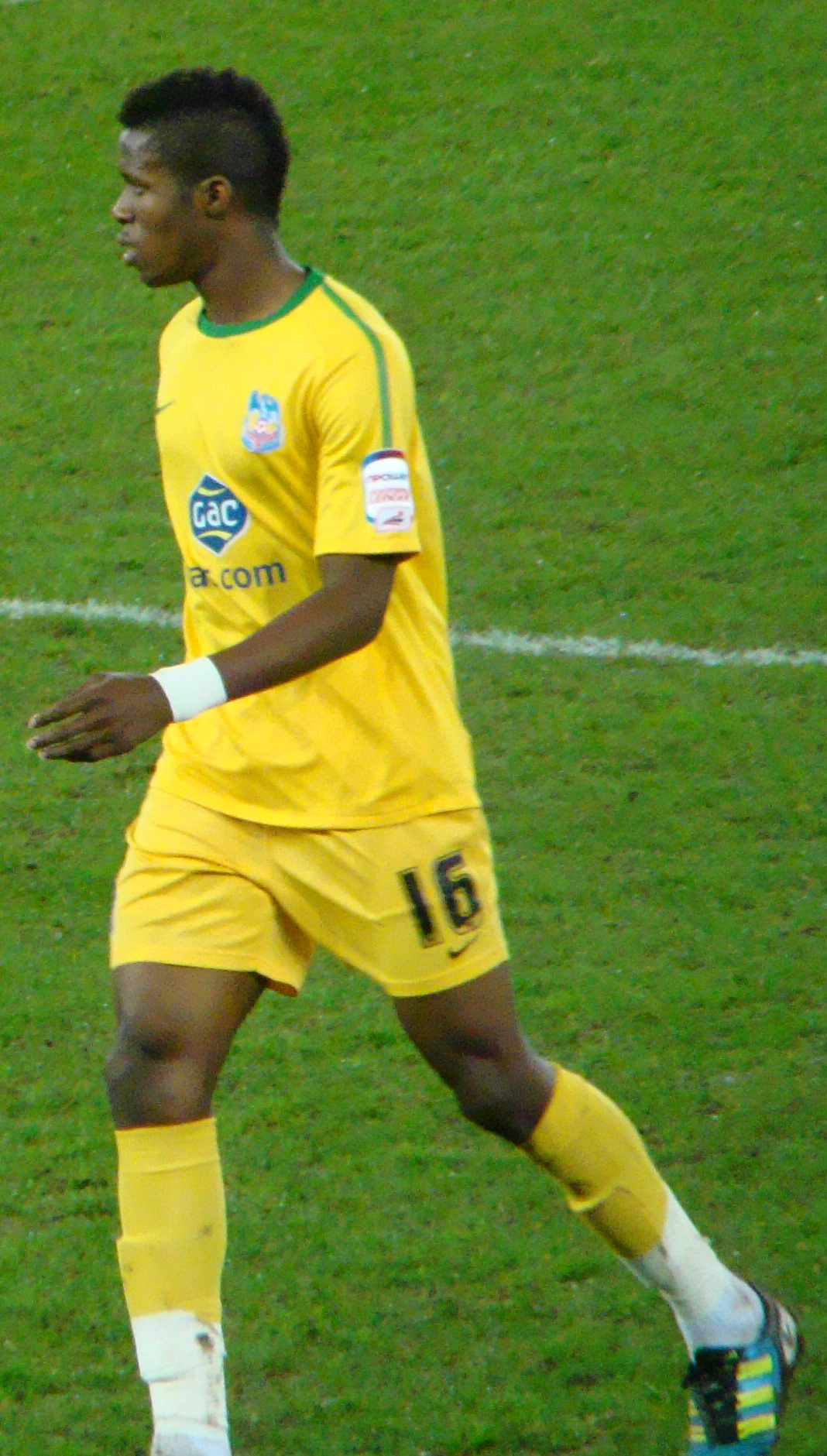
Zaha in League Cup action for Palace against future loan club Cardiff, 2012

Zaha started the 2012–13 season brightly, getting an assist in the League Cup against Exeter City and winning a penalty in the first league match against Watford. Zaha scored his first two goals of the season against Wolverhampton Wanderers on 2 October 2012. He then scored two goals in a match again, four days later, in a 4–3 win over Burnley.

On 5 March 2013, Zaha scored his first goal for Crystal Palace since being loaned back from Manchester United, in a 4–2 victory against promotion rivals Hull City. On 13 May 2013, in the second leg of the play-off semi-final against Brighton & Hove Albion, Zaha scored two goals in the second half to put Crystal Palace into the play-off final at Wembley Stadium. In the play-off final on 27 May 2013, Zaha won a penalty that was converted to secure Crystal Palace a Premier League spot for the 2013–14 season.

=== Manchester United ===
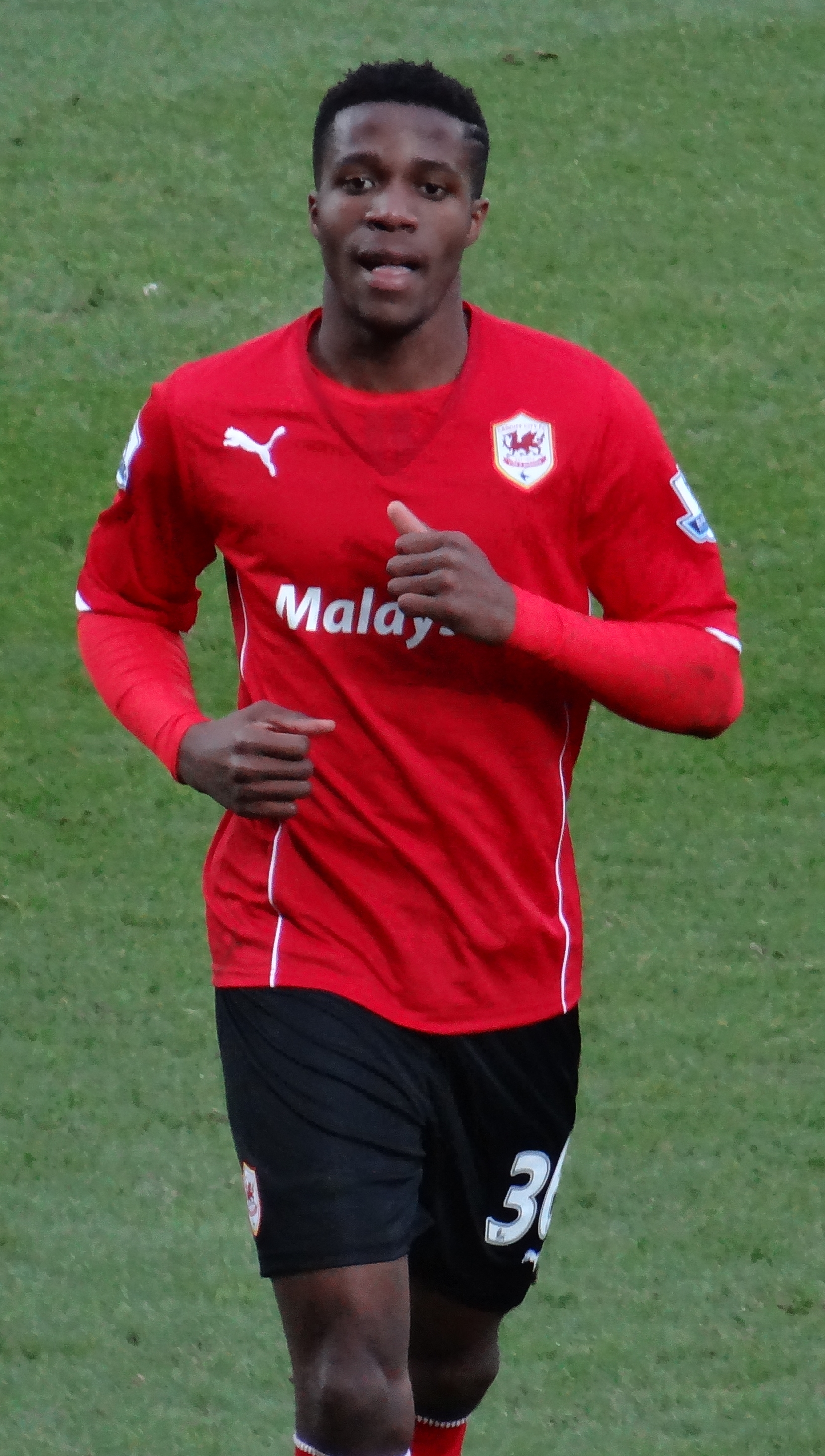
Zaha playing on loan for Cardiff City in 2014

On 25 January 2013, Zaha agreed to join Premier League club Manchester United, and would immediately be loaned back to Crystal Palace for the remainder of the season. Palace tried to delay the transfer and agree the transfer in the summer of 2013, but Football League rules prevented this with the player having to join United and be loaned back to Palace. Zaha passed the medical at Manchester United, signing a five-and-a-half-year contract on 26 January 2013 for a reported £10m rising to £15m with performance-related add-ons.

On 11 August 2013, Zaha made his debut for Manchester United in the 2013 FA Community Shield win against Wigan Athletic. He was included in the starting line-up and played 61 minutes before being replaced by Antonio Valencia He did not play again until 29 October, starting in a 4–0 win over Norwich City in the third round of the League Cup at Old Trafford. His Premier League debut was on 7 December in a 1–0 home loss to Newcastle United, as a substitute for Nani shortly after his team conceded.

On 31 January 2014, Zaha completed a loan move to Cardiff City for the remainder of the 2013–14 season after being left out of favour by manager David Moyes.

At the end of the season, following Moyes' sacking, Zaha said that he was never given a chance by the Scot. He contrasted his experience with that of Raheem Sterling, another young attacker who was given a chance by Liverpool after a difficult start. He also said that he was upset by false and malicious online rumours about his personal life.

=== Return to Crystal Palace ===
==== 2014–15 season ====
On 28 August 2014, Zaha agreed to a season-long loan deal with Crystal Palace. Two days later, in the first match of his loan, he scored a stoppage-time equaliser in a 3–3 draw at Newcastle United. On 2 February 2015, the final day of the winter transfer window, Zaha's move to Palace was made permanent with the signing of a five-and-a-half-year contract for an undisclosed fee, believed to be in the region of £3 million, rising to £6 million with add-ons; Manchester United would also receive a percentage of the fee if Palace sell Zaha in the future. United wouldn't receive this sell-on fee as Zaha would join Galatasaray on a free transfer in 2023.

Zaha played regularly for Crystal Palace throughout the season, finishing the season with four goals and two assists as Crystal Palace finished the league in 10th place.

==== 2015–16 season ====
Again, Zaha was a regular for Crystal Palace in this season, making 34 appearances, scoring two goals and recording one assist, while Crystal Palace finished in 15th place. He helped Crystal Palace reach the 2016 FA Cup Final, by playing in every match since the third round entry and scoring two goals along the way. Zaha played the whole 120 minutes in the final, but could not help Palace to a victory, as Manchester United won 2–1. Zaha won the Crystal Palace Player of the Year award for the first time.

==== 2016–17 season ====
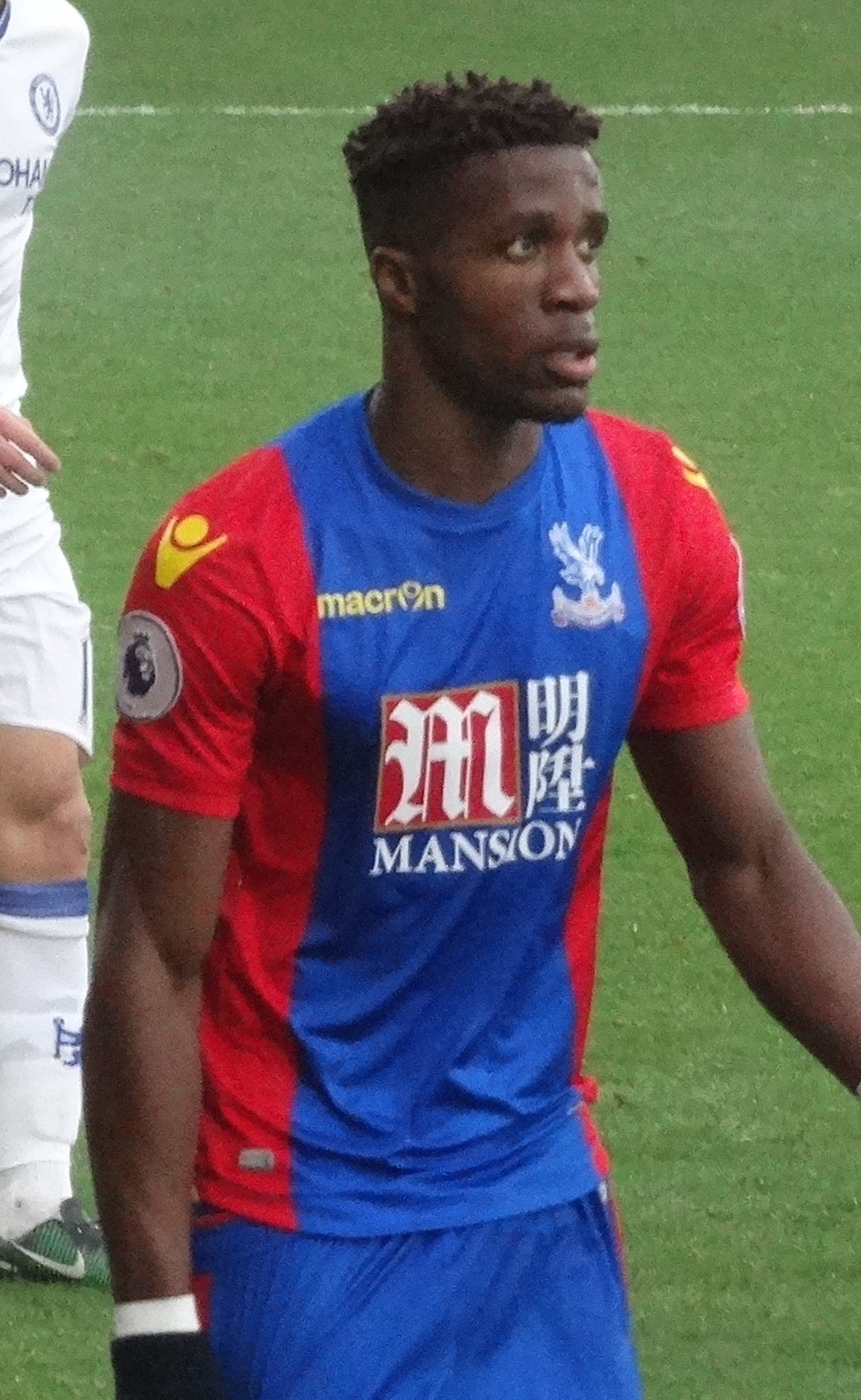
Zaha playing for Palace, 2016

On 26 December 2016, Zaha was denied a penalty in the closing minutes against Watford. Some speculated that Zaha had overplayed the foul or taken a dive. After the match Watford's mascot attempted to rile Zaha up by mimicking a dive in front of him. On 14 May 2017, Zaha scored the opening goal in the third minute of the home game against Hull City that simultaneously mathematically secured Crystal Palace's top flight status and relegated Hull City to the Championship. After another outstanding season with The Eagles, Zaha won Crystal Palace's Player of the Year award for the second year running. On 26 May 2017, Zaha signed a new five-year contract with Crystal Palace.

==== 2017–18 season ====
On 14 October 2017, Zaha returned to Palace's starting line-up for the first time in two months and scored to open a 2–1 win over Chelsea to give the Eagles their first points of the season. He was Premier League Player of the Month for April 2018 for his four goals and assist while playing up front; on 14 April he scored twice in the first half of a 3–2 win over rivals Brighton & Hove Albion.

Despite their poor start, Palace stayed up with a game in hand under new manager Roy Hodgson, with the combination between Zaha and fellow winger Andros Townsend a key factor. He was named their Player of the Year for the third time in a row, a feat only done before by goalkeeper Julián Speroni.

==== 2018–19 season ====
In Palace's first game of the new season on 11 August, Zaha scored the second goal of a 2–0 win at Fulham. It was his 23rd Premier League goal for the club, drawing level with Chris Armstrong as their top scorer in the competition's history. Four days later he signed a new five-year contract at Crystal Palace. On 26 August, with a consolation goal in a 2–1 loss at Watford, he overtook Armstrong to become Palace's Premier League top scorer.

After scoring a winning goal against Huddersfield Town in September 2018, Zaha publicly complained about what he considered to be a lack of appropriate protection by referees against fouls, saying that he would need a broken leg before any action would be taken. Data proved that in the last five years, he was the second most fouled player in the league after Eden Hazard. In October, Zaha was the victim of racist abuse and death threats following a match. Zaha received a second yellow card, the first for mass confrontation with James Ward-Prowse, and the other for dissent on referee Andre Marriner against Southampton on 30 January 2019.

In June 2019, he was linked with a transfer to Arsenal, who made a £40 million offer for the player, which Crystal Palace rejected as too low. In October, he received racial abuse on social media.`

==== 2019–20 season ====
Zaha played in all 38 league matches with Crystal Palace, having a disappointing campaign, scoring only 4 goals, including a long-distance goal against Chelsea.

==== 2020–21 season ====
On 12 September 2020, Zaha scored the only goal in a 1–0 win over Southampton. On 19 September, he scored a brace in a 3–1 away win over his former team Manchester United.

On 13 March 2021, Zaha became the first Premier League player not to take a knee prior to kick-off in Palace's 1–0 win over West Bromwich Albion. Zaha made a statement at the Financial Times' Business of Football summit in February saying that "As a society, I feel we should be encouraging better education in schools, and social media companies should be taking stronger action against people who abuse others online – not just footballers".

On 16 May, Zaha scored his eleventh league goal of the season in a 3–2 win against Aston Villa, setting a new personal best for goals in a Premier League season.

==== 2021–22 season ====
On 27 September 2021, Zaha marked his 400th appearance for Crystal Palace with his 70th goal in a 1–1 draw with rivals Brighton & Hove Albion. On 30 October, Zaha became the first player to score 50 top-flight goals for Crystal Palace in a 2–0 win at Manchester City.

Zaha finished the season as 9th top scorer in the league with 14 goals, to be his new personal best record.

==== 2022–23 season ====
Zaha scored seven goals in only 27 appearances in the Premier League. He missed several matches due to injury in February and April. He also missed the last two games of the season, having been forced off with an injury in a 2–0 win over Bournemouth on 13 May 2023; he played a crucial role in setting up the first goal on what turned out to be his 457th and final appearance for the club.

Zaha's contract expired at the end of the season. Despite being offered a four-year extension worth £200,000 a week by Crystal Palace, Zaha confirmed in an Instagram statement on 23 July 2023 that he would be departing the club after a total of eighteen years.

=== Galatasaray ===
On 23 July 2023, Süper Lig side Galatasaray announced that Zaha arrived in Istanbul to complete his transfer to Turkey. On the next day, he signed a three-year contract with the club who said that Zaha would be paid a signing-on fee of €2.35 million and an annual salary of €4.35 million.

Zaha made his Süper Lig debut against Kayserispor on 12 August. On 20 September, he marked his Champions League group stage debut with an assist for Tetê's goal in a 2–2 home draw against Copenhagen. On 3 October, he scored his first Champions League goal against his former club Manchester United in a 3–2 win at Old Trafford for Galatasaray on his first start in the competition.

==== Loan to Lyon ====
On 30 August 2024, Zaha joined Lyon on loan until the end of the 2024–25 season. Lyon paid Galatasaray a loan fee of €3 million. Following a mutual agreement between Lyon and Galatasaray, his loan was terminated on 22 January 2025.

==== Loan to Charlotte FC ====
On 22 January 2025, it was announced that Zaha would join Major League Soccer club Charlotte FC on a one-year loan, with an option to extend the loan until June 2026. In his 4 March debut against Atlanta United FC, Zaha scored one goal in his team's 2–0 win. On 1 June, he played his 15th league game, which triggered the loan extension until 30 June 2026. He departed the club at the end of his loan spell and returned to his parent club, Galatasaray.

== International career ==
Zaha was eligible to represent both the Ivory Coast, the country of his birth, and England, where he grew up.

=== England (2011–2013) ===
His success over the course of his first full season resulted in a call-up to the England under-19 team for their match against Germany in February 2011. He was called up to the under-21 team on 23 February 2012. He made his debut in a 4–0 win against Belgium on 29 February, assisting Henri Lansbury for the third goal. On 11 November 2012, Zaha was called up to the senior team by manager Roy Hodgson for a friendly match against Sweden on 14 November. He came on as a substitute for fellow debutant Raheem Sterling in the 83rd minute.

When Zaha was in good form for Crystal Palace under Hodgson ahead of the 2018 FIFA World Cup, the manager said that he regretted not fielding the winger in a competitive game to tie him to England.

=== Ivory Coast (2016–present) ===
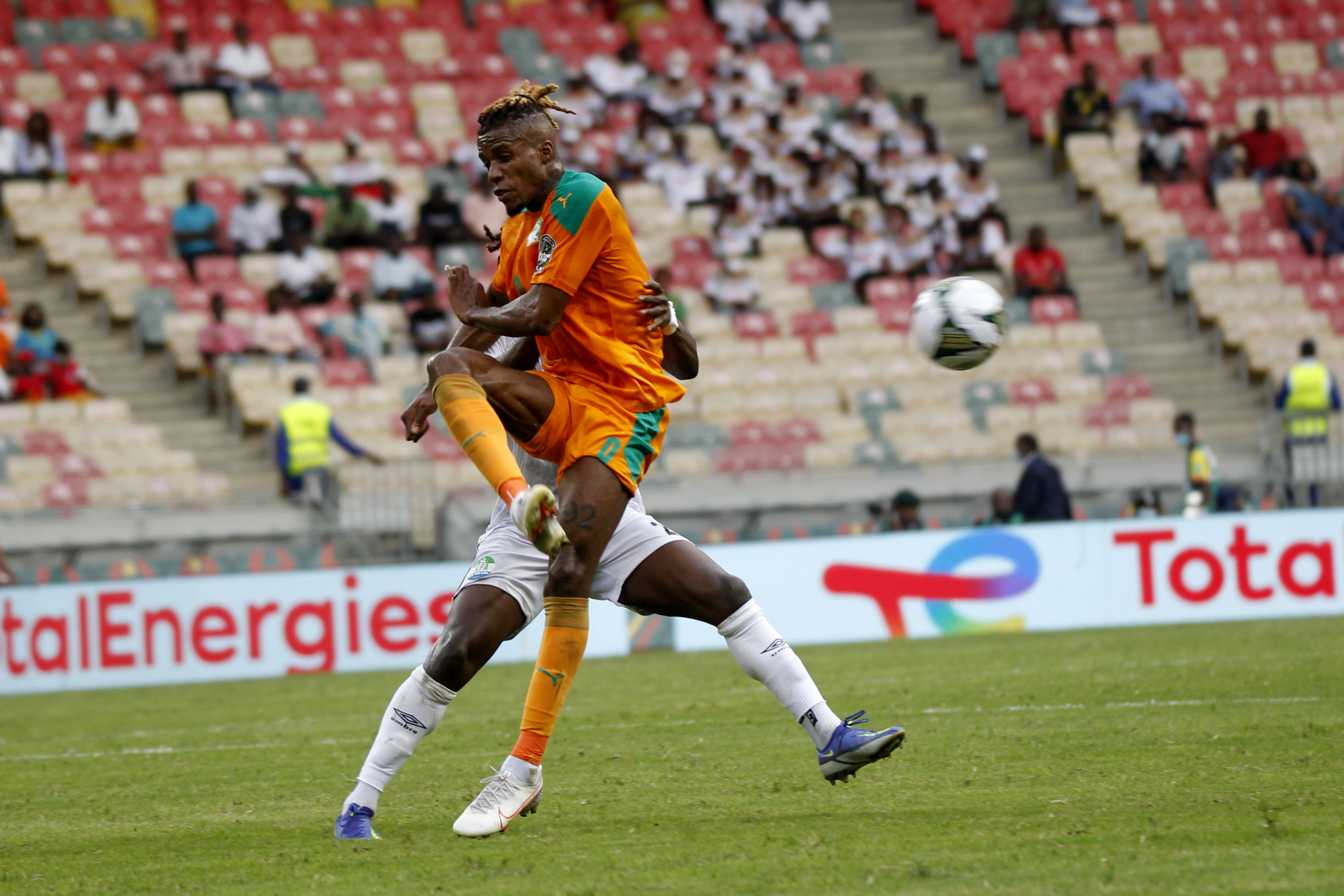
Zaha playing for Ivory Coast at the 2021 Africa Cup of Nations

On 27 November 2016, the Ivorian Football Federation confirmed that Zaha had sent correspondence to FIFA to switch his international football allegiance from England to the Ivory Coast. In response to this development, England manager Gareth Southgate indicated he would try to dissuade Zaha from changing allegiance due to his consistent club form.

In January, Zaha was named in the Ivory Coast squad for the 2017 Africa Cup of Nations. He made his debut against Sweden in a friendly in Abu Dhabi on 8 January, coming on as a half-time substitute and assisting Giovanni Sio's goal in a 2–1 win. Three days later, against Uganda at the same venue, he made his first international start and scored his first goal in a 3–0 win. At the tournament in Gabon, the reigning champion Elephants were eliminated at the group stage, with Zaha starting each game.

Zaha was also called up for the 2019 Africa Cup of Nations in Egypt. He scored two goals at the tournament, one in a 4–1 win over Namibia in the final group game, and the game's only goal in the last 16 match against Mali. The Elephants were defeated on penalties in the quarter final by the eventual winners, Algeria.

== Style of play ==
Zaha can play as a forward or as a winger, usually on the left where he can cut inside with his right foot. In 2018, Adrian Clarke of the Premier League's website opined that he "offers more threat" as a frontman, going on to add that "his ultra-mobile combination with [Andros] Townsend generates more goals and points", citing "the speed, athleticism and unpredictable movement of the Zaha–Townsend axis is more difficult for opponents to contain". This often forces defenders to resort to stopping him by committing fouls, with Zaha having induced the most red cards for opponents in the history of the Premier League.

Zaha has often been accused of diving; however, Roy Hodgson, who managed him at club level for Crystal Palace and internationally for England, has stated: "Wilf Zaha does not dive for penalties. He gets knocked over sometimes – sometimes he gets knocked over or unbalanced without it being a penalty or a foul – because he runs at such speed and has such agility with the ball. But he certainly doesn't dive." Hodgson also said that Zaha's characterisation as a diver is because of a "campaign" and it causes fouls against him to be dismissed by referees.

== Personal life ==
Zaha married Paige Bannister in July 2023.

He is a co-chairman of Isthmian League South East club AFC Croydon Athletic, alongside Danny Young and Michael Owuo Jr., better known as Stormzy.

== Career statistics ==
=== Club ===
As of match played 23 May 2026

Appearances and goals by club, season and competition
Club	Season	League			National cup (Note: Includes FA Cup, Turkish Cup)		League cup (Note: Includes Football League/EFL Cup)		Continental		Other		Total	
Club	Season	Division	Apps	Goals	Apps	Goals	Apps	Goals	Apps	Goals	Apps	Goals	Apps	Goals
Crystal Palace	2009–10	Championship	1	0	0	0	0	0	—		—		1	0
Crystal Palace	2010–11	Championship	41	1	1	0	2	0	—		—		44	1
Crystal Palace	2011–12	Championship	41	6	0	0	7	3	—		—		48	9
Crystal Palace	2012–13 (Note: Part of this season was spent on loan from Manchester United)	Championship	43	6	2	0	2	0	—		3 (Note: Appearances in Championship play-offs)	2	50	8
Crystal Palace	Total		126	13	3	0	11	3	—		3	2	143	18
Manchester United	2013–14	Premier League	2	0	0	0	1	0	0	0	1 (Note: Appearance in FA Community Shield)	0	4	0
Manchester United	2014–15	Premier League	0	0	—		0	0	—		—		0	0
Manchester United	Total		2	0	0	0	1	0	0	0	1	0	4	0
Cardiff City (loan)	2013–14	Premier League	12	0	1	0	—		—		—		13	0
Crystal Palace	2014–15	Premier League	31	4	3	0	1	0	—		—		35	4
Crystal Palace	2015–16	Premier League	34	2	6	2	3	1	—		—		43	5
Crystal Palace	2016–17	Premier League	35	7	0	0	2	0	—		—		37	7
Crystal Palace	2017–18	Premier League	29	9	0	0	0	0	—		—		29	9
Crystal Palace	2018–19	Premier League	34	10	2	0	0	0	—		—		36	10
Crystal Palace	2019–20	Premier League	38	4	0	0	1	0	—		—		39	4
Crystal Palace	2020–21	Premier League	30	11	1	0	0	0	—		—		31	11
Crystal Palace	2021–22	Premier League	33	14	3	1	1	0	—		—		37	15
Crystal Palace	2022–23	Premier League	27	7	1	0	0	0	—		—		28	7
Crystal Palace	Total		291	68	16	3	8	1	—		—		315	72
Crystal Palace	Crystal Palace total		417	81	19	3	19	4	—		3	2	458	90
Galatasaray	2023–24	Süper Lig	30	9	3	0	—		9 (Note: Seven appearances and one goal in UEFA Champions League, two appearances in UEFA Europa League)	1	0	0	42	10
Galatasaray	2024–25	Süper Lig	0	0	—		—		0	0	1 (Note: Appearance in Turkish Super Cup)	0	1	0
Galatasaray	Total		30	9	3	0	—		9	1	1	0	43	10
Lyon (loan)	2024–25	Ligue 1	4	0	0	0	—		2 (Note: Appearances in UEFA Europa League)	0	—		6	0
Charlotte FC (loan)	2025	Major League Soccer	31	10	0	0	—		—		4 (Note: Two appearances in Leagues Cup, two appearances in MLS Cup playoffs)	0	35	10
Charlotte FC (loan)	2026	Major League Soccer	13	3	0	0	—		—		0	0	13	3
Charlotte FC (loan)	Total		44	13	0	0	—		—		4	0	48	13
Career total			509	103	23	3	20	4	11	1	9	2	572	113

=== International ===
As of match played 31 December 2025

Appearances and goals by national team and year
National team	Year	Apps	Goals
England	2012	1	0
England	2013	1	0
England	Total	2	0
Ivory Coast	2017	8	2
Ivory Coast	2018	1	0
Ivory Coast	2019	8	3
Ivory Coast	2020	1	0
Ivory Coast	2021	3	0
Ivory Coast	2022	10	0
Ivory Coast	2023	2	0
Ivory Coast	2024	0	0
Ivory Coast	2025	3	0
Ivory Coast	Total	36	5
Career total		38	5

As of match played 31 December 2025. Ivory Coast score listed first, score column indicates score after each Zaha goal.

International goals by date, venue, cap, opponent, score, result and competition
No.	Date	Venue	Cap	Opponent	Score	Result	Competition	Ref.
1	11 January 2017	Zayed Sports City Stadium, Abu Dhabi, United Arab Emirates	2	Uganda	2–0	3–0	Friendly	
2	24 March 2017	Krasnodar Stadium, Krasnodar, Russia	6	Russia	2–0	2–0	Friendly	
3	1 July 2019	30 June Stadium, Cairo, Egypt	14	Namibia	3–1	4–1	2019 Africa Cup of Nations	
4	8 July 2019	Suez Stadium, Suez, Egypt	15	Mali	1–0	1–0	2019 Africa Cup of Nations	
5	13 October 2019	Stade de la Licorne, Amiens, France	17	DR Congo	3–1	3–1	Friendly	

== Honours ==
Crystal Palace

- Football League Championship play-offs: 2013
- FA Cup runner-up: 2015–16

Manchester United

- FA Community Shield: 2013

Galatasaray

- Süper Lig: 2023–24
- Turkish Super Cup: 2023

Individual

- Football League Young Player of the Month: October 2012
- PFA Team of the Year: 2012–13 Championship
- Crystal Palace Player of the Year: 2015–16, 2016–17, 2017–18
- Premier League Player of the Month: April 2018
- Premier League Goal of the Month: February 2022

== See also ==
- List of England international footballers born outside England
