= Adnan Januzaj =

Belgian footballer (born 1995)

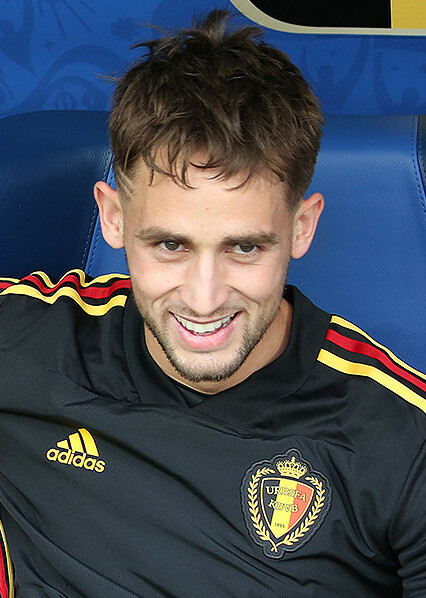
- Januzaj with Belgium at the 2018 FIFA World Cup

Personal information
- Full name: Adnan Januzaj
- Date of birth: 5 February 1995 (age 31)
- Place of birth: Brussels, Belgium
- Height: 1.86 m (6 ft 1 in)
- Position: Winger

Youth career
- 2001–2005: FC Brussels
- 2005–2011: Anderlecht
- 2011–2013: Manchester United

Senior career*
Years	Team	Apps	(Gls)
2013–2017	Manchester United	50	(5)
2015–2016	→ Borussia Dortmund (loan)	6	(0)
2016–2017	→ Sunderland (loan)	25	(0)
2017–2022	Real Sociedad	132	(15)
2022–2026	Sevilla	22	(0)
2023	→ İstanbul Başakşehir (loan)	11	(2)
2024–2025	→ Las Palmas (loan)	18	(2)

International career^{‡}
2014–2022	Belgium	15	(1)
Medal record
Men's football
Representing Belgium
FIFA World Cup
Third place	2018 Russia
- * Club domestic league appearances and goals as of 23:19, 1 March 2026 (UTC) ‡ National team caps and goals as of 22:45, 29 March 2022 (UTC)

Adnan Januzaj (born 5 February 1995) is a Belgian professional footballer who plays as a winger.

Born and raised in Brussels, Januzaj began his career with Anderlecht before joining Manchester United in 2011 at the age of 16. Januzaj broke into the Manchester United first-team under manager David Moyes during the 2013–14 season, but struggled for opportunities under Moyes' successors Louis van Gaal and José Mourinho, and had loan spells at Borussia Dortmund and Sunderland before joining Real Sociedad in July 2017.

Januzaj made his full international debut in 2014 and later that year played for Belgium at the FIFA World Cup in 2014 and 2018, reaching the semi-finals of the latter tournament.

== Club career ==
=== Manchester United ===
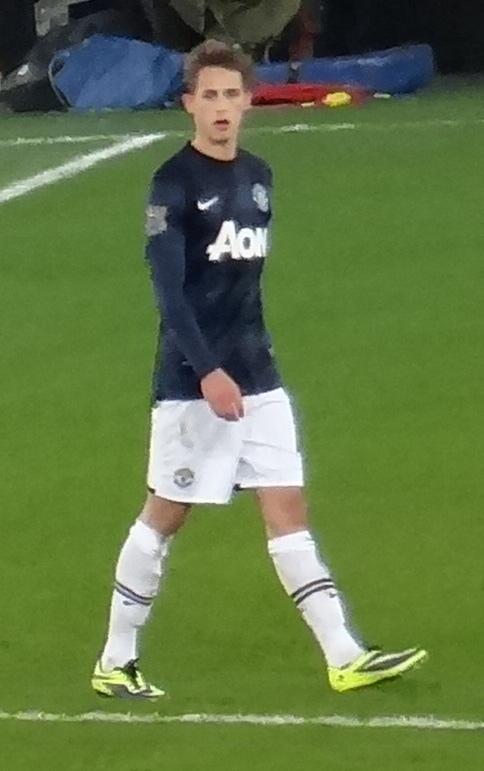
Januzaj playing for Manchester United in 2013

Januzaj began his football career with FC Brussels but joined Anderlecht as a ten-year-old in 2005. He left Anderlecht for Manchester United at the age of 16 in March 2011, after impressing in a skills session in Brussels.

Towards the end of the 2012–13 season, United manager Sir Alex Ferguson promoted Januzaj to the first-team and he was registered with the number 44 jersey; he did not feature in the remainder of the season, but he was an unused substitute in the final game of the season away to West Bromwich Albion. For his performances during the season, Januzaj won the 2013 Denzil Haroun Reserve Team Player of the Year award. He was included in the first-team squad for the 2013–14 pre-season tour of Asia and scored in the final game of the tour against Hong Kong side Kitchee five minutes after being substituted on. He also started in Rio Ferdinand's testimonial; United lost 3–1 to Sevilla, but Januzaj provided the assist for United's only goal.

"It's a great thrill to be able to sign for Manchester United. Since arriving here, I have always felt like this was the right club for me. This season has been great for me – going on the pre-season tour, making my debut in the Community Shield win at Wembley and then breaking into the team at Sunderland – it's like a dream. I want to work hard now and establish myself as a Manchester United player."

— Januzaj on signing a new five-year contract with Manchester United in October 2013.

==== 2013–14 season ====
Januzaj made his competitive debut for Manchester United against Wigan Athletic on 11 August 2013 in the Community Shield, coming on for Robin van Persie with six minutes left to play. He made his Premier League debut a month later, coming on as a 68th-minute substitute for Ashley Young in a 2–0 home win over Crystal Palace on 14 September. On 5 October 2013, in what was his first start for the club, Januzaj scored twice as United came from behind to claim a 2–1 victory away to Sunderland. In an effort to stave off interest from other clubs, who could have signed Januzaj for "minimal compensation" on the expiry of his existing contract in June 2014, Manchester United signed Januzaj to a new five-year contract on 19 October 2013. On 3 December 2013, he was nominated for the BBC Young Sports Personality of the Year; at the time of his nomination, he had played in ten games for Manchester United.

Januzaj was left out of Manchester United's initial squad for the UEFA Champions League when it was registered in September 2013, which came as a surprise to some members of the media after his impressive start to the season. Manager David Moyes later explained this was a tactical decision to allow the club to register an additional player for the competition; as Januzaj had not been with the club long enough to be eligible for the 'List B' squad, which for 2013–14 included any player born after 1 January 1992 who had been eligible to play for the club for at least two years, he would have had to be registered as one of only 25 'List A' players, taking up a space that could have been used by another player. By waiting until 7 October 2013 to register Januzaj, he became eligible as a List B player, but this meant that he could not be selected for the club's first two matches in the competition, at home to Bayer Leverkusen and away to Shakhtar Donetsk. Despite being available from the third game of the tournament, at home to Real Sociedad, Januzaj was left out of both games against the Spanish club and the return match against Bayer Leverkusen. He made his Champions League debut at home to Shakhtar Donetsk on 10 December 2013.

==== 2014–15 season ====
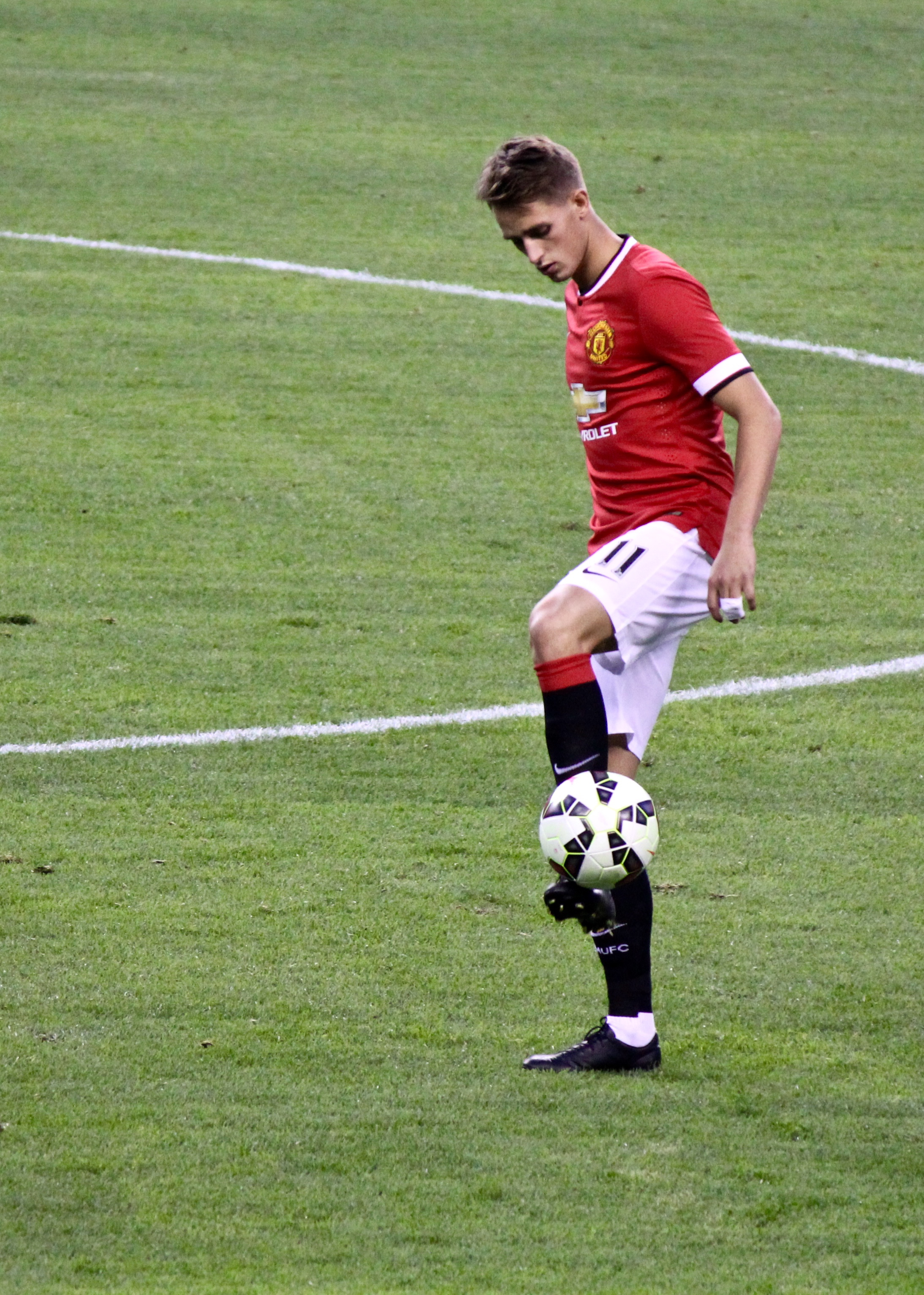
Januzaj playing for Manchester United in 2015

At the start of the 2014–15 season, Januzaj was allocated the number 11 shirt, previously worn by the recently retired Ryan Giggs. He made his first appearance of the season as a substitute in United's opening Premier League match; a 1–2 loss at home to Swansea City. His first start of the season came in a 2–2 draw with West Bromwich Albion on 20 October 2014, in which he struggled against physical defenders Sébastien Pocognoli and Joleon Lescott.

==== 2015–16 season ====
After not scoring in any competitions the previous season, and not making the bench for the first game of the new campaign, Januzaj scored his first goal for over a year on 14 August 2015, a close range 29th-minute strike which gave United victory at Aston Villa. His first appearance upon return from loan came against Southampton on 23 January 2016, when he replaced Cameron Borthwick-Jackson as a late substitute.

==== Loan to Borussia Dortmund ====
On 31 August 2015, Januzaj was loaned to German club Borussia Dortmund on a season-long deal. On 6 January 2016, he was recalled to United after only playing in 12 games for Dortmund in the first half of the season, starting three times.

==== Loan to Sunderland ====
On 12 August 2016, Januzaj agreed to join Sunderland on a season-long loan move from Manchester United, linking up with former Manchester United manager David Moyes. Januzaj made his debut the following day, coming off the bench against Manchester City in a 2–1 defeat on the opening weekend of the Premier League season. In his third game for Sunderland against Shrewsbury Town, Januzaj scored his first goal for the team, a late winner. Januzaj was sent off for two yellow cards on 18 September in a 1–0 loss at Tottenham. Six days later, he suffered an ankle injury that ruled him out for at least six weeks during the 3–2 defeat to Crystal Palace. In December, Moyes said that despite Januzaj's talent, he needed to improve his performances at Sunderland if he wanted to break into Manchester United's squad.

=== Real Sociedad ===
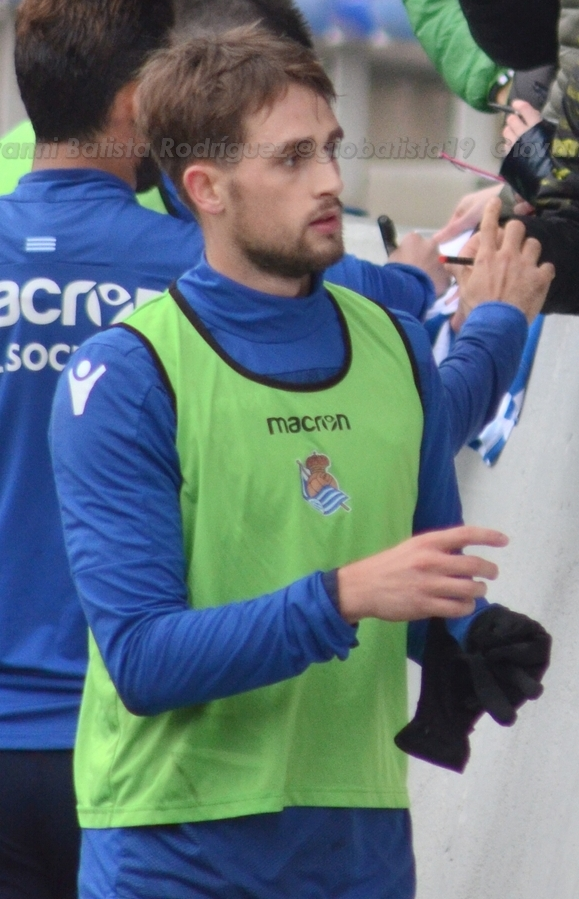
Januzaj training with Real Sociedad in 2018

Having failed to hold onto his place in the Manchester United squad, Januzaj signed a five-year contract with Spanish club Real Sociedad in July 2017. He made his debut in La Liga on 10 September, starting in a 4–2 win at Deportivo de La Coruña, and scored his first goal on 5 November in a 3–1 home victory against Basque neighbours Eibar. He also scored in a draw with Las Palmas and was one of three nominees for La Liga Player of the Month. He also scored a late equaliser against Atletico Madrid that proved vital to secure his team a European place.

=== Sevilla ===
After being released by Real Sociedad at the end of the 2021–22 season, Januzaj signed a four-year contract with Sevilla on 31 August 2022.

==== Loan to İstanbul Başakşehir ====
On 3 February 2023, Januzaj signed for Süper Lig club İstanbul Başakşehir on loan until the end of the season.

==== Loan to Las Palmas ====
On 24 July 2024, Januzaj joined Las Palmas also in the Spanish top tier on loan for the 2024–25 campaign.

==== Return to Sevilla and departure ====
Januzaj left Sevilla after his contract expired in June 2026.

== International career ==
Due to his Kosovan-Albanian parents, in 2013, media reported that Januzaj was eligible to represent several national teams - Belgium (through being born there and having a Belgian passport), Albania (through his Albanian descent) and Kosovo (which was not a FIFA member at that time), as well as Serbia, Turkey and Croatia. About this case, Abedin Januzaj (Adnan's father) stated "I am not closing the doors to Albania, because we are Albanian. However, they are closing the doors to themselves. I only deal with professionals on the issue," and said that Adnan would not represent Serbia, Turkey or Croatia because "we have no connections with these countries".

In October 2013, England manager Roy Hodgson stated that The Football Association was monitoring the player with a view to calling him up if Januzaj was naturalised as a British citizen (and passed the residency requirement of FIFA, according to David Moyes). However, despite widespread press coverage, Januzaj did not meet the requirements to play for England under the rules set out in the Home Nations agreement, which requires that players engage in a minimum of five years of education before the age of 18 within the territory of the relevant association and national team eligibility through residency as an adult is not applicable.

Despite having played competitively for Belgium at senior level, Januzaj remained eligible to represent Kosovo, as it was not a UEFA or FIFA member when he made his Belgian debut. However, once he made another appearance with Belgium after 2016 (the year in which Kosovo became a member of FIFA), Januzaj became ineligible to represent Kosovo and could from then on represent Belgium only.

=== Belgium ===
In June 2013, the former coach of the Belgian under-18 and under-19 teams, Marc Van Geersom, declared that Januzaj had refused a call-up to the Belgian team a number of times, since he would prefer to play for Albania.

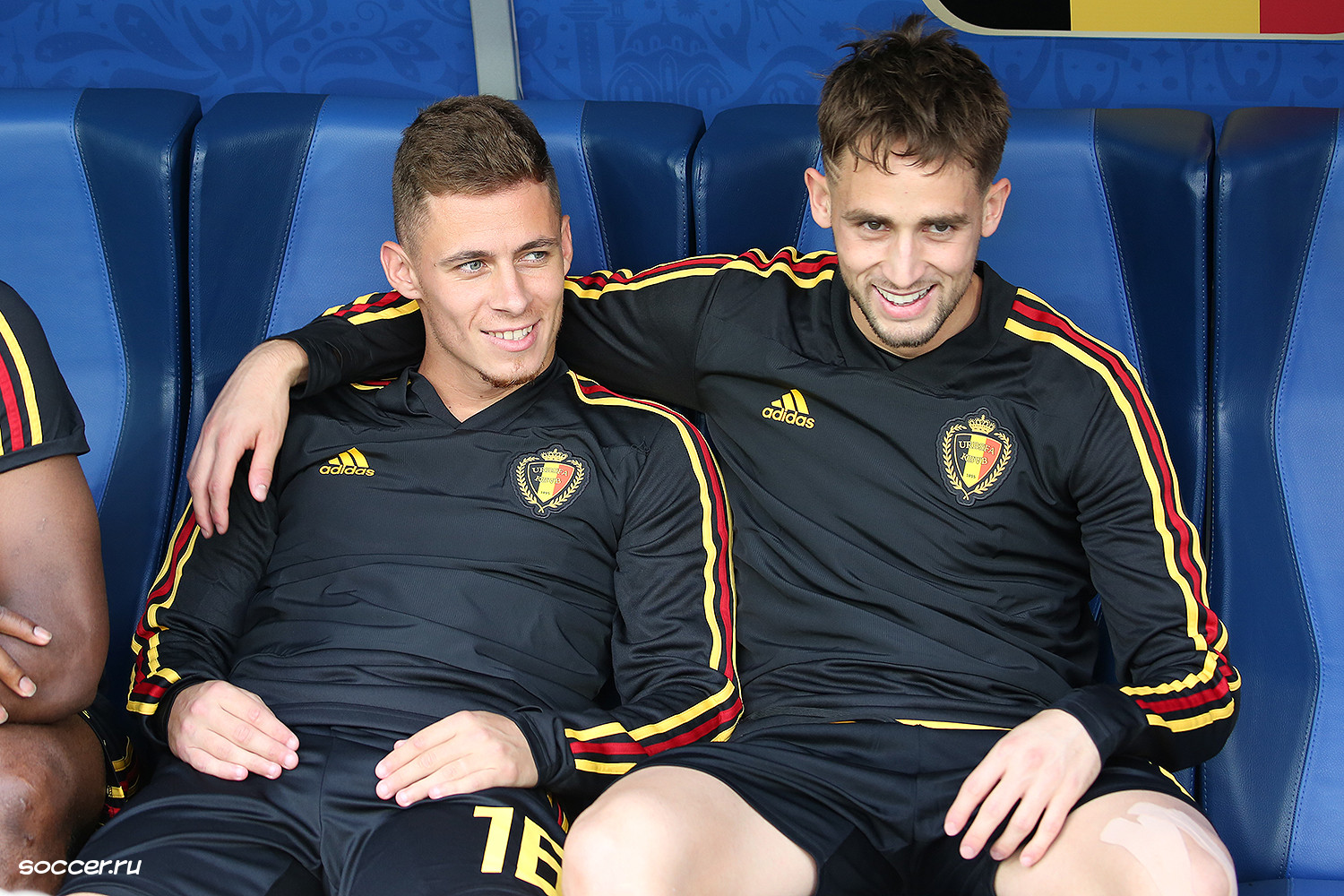
Januzaj and Thorgan Hazard at the 2018 World Cup

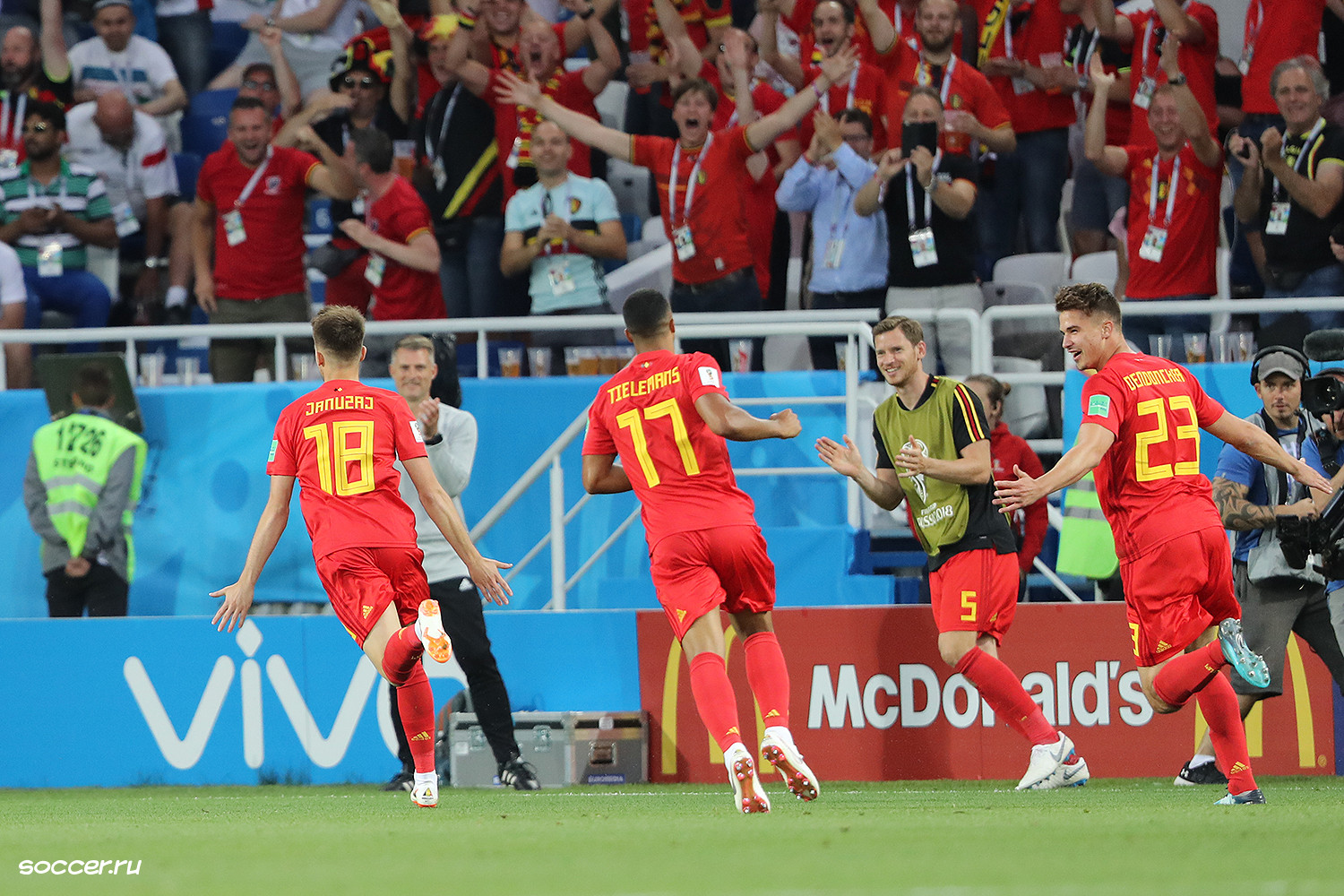
Januzaj after scoring Belgium's winning goal against England at the 2018 FIFA World Cup in Russia

On 7 October 2013, former national team coach Marc Wilmots attempted to select Januzaj for the 2014 FIFA World Cup qualifying games against Croatia and Wales, but Januzaj refused the call-up, saying he still needs to make a choice. In response, Wilmots stated: "I wanted to send him a clear signal. Just as Zakaria Bakkali, Adnan is a very promising youngster and I would like to integrate him into the group. I do not want to force his hand. I respect his choice and consider discussing with Adnan and his family". On 16 October, discussing rumours that suggested Januzaj would choose to represent Belgium if he is included in the 2014 FIFA World Cup squad, Wilmots declared: "The boy was born in Belgium, should he say that he wants to play for Belgium – from there, there is no haggling. I'm not going to play that game. If you're at the top level in Manchester or elsewhere, show me your skills and if I need you I will call. I make no promises, to Januzaj or any person". The following day, Januzaj's father told Kosovar TV station KTV that he did not like the Belgian federation's approach: "I am not blackmailing them as I'm not asking for any national team to get my son. It is them who want Adnan. [...] you have to be professional in this issue. Belgium should follow the rules as well. I run his career in a sportive sense, and I have Belgium managers running the legal issues."

On 23 April 2014, Wilmots announced that Januzaj had committed himself to the Belgium national team. This message was confirmed the day itself by Januzaj's manager Dirk De Vriese. On 13 May 2014, Januzaj was included in Belgium's 23-man squad for the 2014 FIFA World Cup. He played a first game with the national team two weeks later in a match against Luxembourg, but he did not earn his first cap; the match was considered unofficial by FIFA on 4 June because Belgian coach Wilmots made 7 substitutions while only 6 are allowed in international friendlies. His official debut came in the next warm-up game, a 1–0 win over Tunisia on 7 June, replacing Eden Hazard after 73 minutes.

In November 2017, Januzaj was recalled to the Belgian squad for the first time in three years ahead of friendlies against Mexico and Japan, but did not play. In June, he was named by Roberto Martínez in the 23-man squad for the 2018 FIFA World Cup in Russia. In the final group game against England in Kaliningrad, he scored the only goal as the Belgians advanced as group winners.

== Style of play ==
As a teenager at Manchester United, Januzaj was seen as a potential generational talent, according to the Manchester Evening News. He is a left-footed winger who can play on either flank. Early in the 2015-16 season Manchester United F.C season, he was also used as an attacking midfielder behind striker Wayne Rooney. During his time at Real Sociedad, the club described him as a versatile attacker capable of playing across the front line, noting his dribbling and link-up play. He has also taken set pieces, serving as a free kick taker for United's youth teams, Real Sociedad, and Las Palmas.

== Sponsorship ==
In 2014, New Balance announced that they were taking over Warrior Sports, and they would be intent on making their own football boots. They recruited many professional footballers, including Januzaj, who also featured in an advertisement promoting the new range.

== Career statistics ==
=== Club ===
As of match played 1 March 2026

Appearances and goals by club, season and competition
Club	Season	League			National cup (Note: Includes FA Cup, DFB-Pokal, Copa del Rey, Turkish Cup)		League cup (Note: Includes Football League/EFL Cup)		Europe		Other		Total	
Club	Season	Division	Apps	Goals	Apps	Goals	Apps	Goals	Apps	Goals	Apps	Goals	Apps	Goals
Manchester United	2012–13	Premier League	0	0	0	0	0	0	0	0	—		0	0
Manchester United	2013–14	Premier League	27	4	1	0	4	0	2 (Note: Appearances in UEFA Champions League)	0	1 (Note: Appearance in FA Community Shield)	0	35	4
Manchester United	2014–15	Premier League	18	0	2	0	1	0	—		—		21	0
Manchester United	2015–16	Premier League	5	1	0	0	0	0	2	0	—		7	1
Manchester United	Total		50	5	3	0	5	0	4	0	1	0	63	5
Borussia Dortmund (loan)	2015–16	Bundesliga	6	0	1	0	—		5 (Note: Appearances in UEFA Europa League)	0	—		12	0
Sunderland (loan)	2016–17	Premier League	25	0	2	0	1	1	—		—		28	1
Real Sociedad	2017–18	La Liga	28	3	1	0	—		6	1	—		35	4
Real Sociedad	2018–19	La Liga	20	1	4	1	—		—		—		24	2
Real Sociedad	2019–20	La Liga	24	4	5	4	—		—		—		29	8
Real Sociedad	2020–21	La Liga	27	4	1	0	—		7	0	1 (Note: Appearance in Supercopa de España)	0	36	4
Real Sociedad	2021–22	La Liga	33	3	4	1	—		7	1	—		44	5
Real Sociedad	Total		132	15	15	6	—		20	2	1	0	168	23
Sevilla	2022–23	La Liga	2	0	1	0	—		3	0	—		6	0
Sevilla	2023–24	La Liga	8	0	3	0	—		0	0	0	0	11	0
Sevilla	2025–26	La Liga	12	0	1	2	—		—		—		13	2
Sevilla	Total		22	0	5	2	—		3	0	0	0	30	2
İstanbul Başakşehir (loan)	2022–23	Süper Lig	11	2	4	0	—		2 (Note: Appearances in UEFA Europa Conference League)	1	—		17	3
Las Palmas (loan)	2024–25	La Liga	18	2	2	0	—		—		—		20	2
Career total			264	24	32	8	6	1	34	3	2	0	338	36

=== International ===
As of match played 29 March 2022

Appearances and goals by national team and year
National team	Year	Apps	Goals
Belgium	2014	6	0
Belgium	2015	0	0
Belgium	2016	0	0
Belgium	2017	0	0
Belgium	2018	4	1
Belgium	2019	2	0
Belgium	2020	0	0
Belgium	2021	1	0
Belgium	2022	2	0
Total		15	1

List of international goals scored by Adnan Januzaj
No.	Date	Venue	Cap	Opponent	Score	Result	Competition
1	28 June 2018	Kaliningrad Stadium, Kaliningrad, Russia	9	England	1–0	1–0	2018 FIFA World Cup

== Honours ==
Manchester United

- FA Community Shield: 2013

Real Sociedad

- Copa del Rey: 2019–20

Belgium

- FIFA World Cup third place: 2018

Individual

- Denzil Haroun Reserve Player of the Year: 2012–13
- Blue Stars/FIFA Youth Cup Golden Ball: 2013
