= Phil Jones (footballer, born 1992) =

English footballer

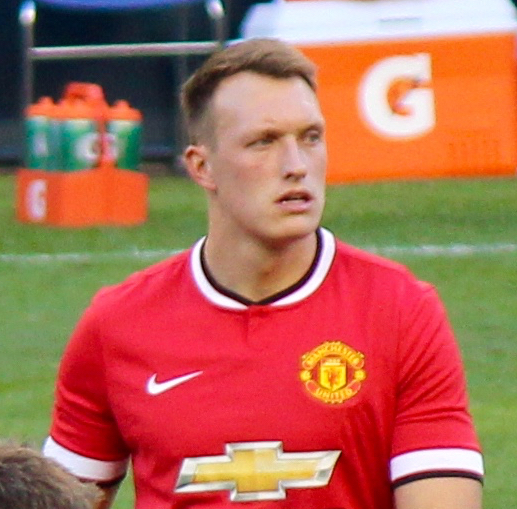
- Jones playing for Manchester United in 2015

Personal information
- Full name: Philip Anthony Jones
- Date of birth: 21 February 1992 (age 34)
- Place of birth: Preston, England
- Height: 5 ft 11 in (1.80 m)
- Positions: Defender; defensive midfielder

Team information
- Current team: Sheffield United (first-team coach)

Youth career
- Ribble Wanderers
- 2002–2009: Blackburn Rovers

Senior career*
Years	Team	Apps	(Gls)
2009–2011	Blackburn Rovers	35	(0)
2011–2023	Manchester United	169	(2)
Total		204	(2)

International career
2009–2010	England U19	4	(0)
2010–2011	England U21	9	(0)
2011–2018	England	27	(0)
- * Club domestic league appearances and goals

Philip Anthony Jones (born 21 February 1992) is an English former professional footballer who played as a defender. Although primarily a centre-back, he was also used as a right-back or defensive midfielder. He is currently a first-team coach at Sheffield United.

Jones began his career at Blackburn Rovers, he joined Manchester United in 2011, where he spent the vast majority of his senior career.

Jones represented England at various levels. He played for the under-19 team in 2009 before making his debut for the under-21 team in 2010. He made his debut for the England senior team in 2011, going on to make 27 appearances. Jones was a part of the England squads for the UEFA Euro 2012, 2014 FIFA World Cup and 2018 FIFA World Cup.

== Early life ==
Jones was born in Preston, Lancashire, and grew up in nearby Clayton-le-Woods. He attended Balshaw's CE High School in Leyland, and played for the Ribble Wanderers under-10 team.

== Club career ==
=== Blackburn Rovers ===
Jones joined the Blackburn Rovers youth team in 2002. He then joined the senior team for the 2009–10 Premier League season, signing a two-year professional contract. He made his first-team debut for Blackburn after starting the League Cup match against Nottingham Forest on 22 September 2009, in which Blackburn won 1–0. Then in February 2010, he signed a new five-year contract that included a £16 million release clause. Jones made his first Premier League start for Blackburn against Chelsea on 21 March, just a month after turning 18. He was widely praised for his committed and assured performance at centre-back, making several crucial blocks and interceptions as Rovers held the champions to a 1–1 draw at Ewood Park. In the 2009–10 season, he made nine league appearances, and three cup appearances.

The 2010–11 season started in promising fashion with Jones starting in the opening match of the campaign against Everton, and subsequently playing the majority of the club's matches in the first half of the season, albeit in an unfamiliar defensive midfield role. A torn knee cartilage injury in a match against West Ham United in December, threatened to rule him out for the remainder of the season. However, on 19 March 2011, he made his return from injury against Blackpool at Ewood Park coming on as a second-half substitute for Brett Emerton in a 2–2 draw. On 2 April 2011, Jones started a first-team match for the first time in four months against Arsenal at the Emirates Stadium, playing the full 90 minutes in a 0–0 draw. Despite his injury, he played 26 league matches, and two cup matches for Blackburn that season.

=== Manchester United ===
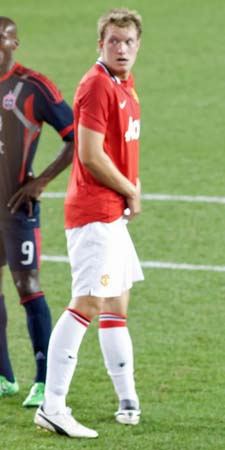
Jones playing for Manchester United in 2011

At the end of the 2010–11 season, Manchester United were reportedly interested in signing Jones. Alex Ferguson was apparently impressed with Jones' commitment and leadership skills at centre-back when Blackburn held United to a 1–1 draw on the day United clinched the title. On 13 June 2011, United confirmed that they had reached an agreement to sign Jones on a five-year deal for an undisclosed transfer fee believed to be at least £16.5 million; the deal would be finalised upon his return from international duty. He made his debut for the club on the 2011 pre-season tour to the United States, in United's 3–1 victory over Chicago Fire.

Jones made his competitive debut for United as a second-half substitute, replacing Rio Ferdinand in the 2011 FA Community Shield against rivals Manchester City. United were 2–0 behind, but won 3–2. Jones made his league debut a week later, again as a substitute replacing Ferdinand, as United beat West Bromwich Albion 2–1 on the opening weekend. On 10 September, Jones provided two assists for Wayne Rooney in United's 5–0 thumping of Bolton Wanderers at the Reebok Stadium. Jones started the away match to Liverpool as a box-to-box midfielder, different from his usual centre-back and full-back positions he was accustomed to. Jones scored his first ever senior goal on 3 December in a 1–0 away win against Aston Villa. Jones scored a consolation goal against Basel in a 2–1 Champions League defeat that resulted in United being knocked out of the competition, heading in a loose ball after Federico Macheda's shot had come back off the bar. On 21 December, he suffered a facial injury in an away match against Fulham, however the X-ray showed no serious damage and Jones returned to action in the 3–2 defeat against Blackburn on 31 December.

After suffering a back problem and having a knee operation which kept him out for the start of the 2012–13 season, Jones made his first appearance in an away match against Galatasaray in the Champions League on 20 November. He scored his first goal of the 2013–14 season on 29 October in a 4–0 win against Norwich City in the League Cup. On 10 December, he scored the only goal of the match in a 1–0 win against Shakhtar Donetsk in the final group-stage match of the Champions League, ensuring United finished top of the group.

On 1 July 2015, Jones signed a new four-year contract with United. On 8 February 2019, he signed a new contract until 2023. On 9 February, Jones assisted Anthony Martial in a 3–0 win over Fulham, his first goal involvement since 2014. On 26 January 2020, he scored in a 6–0 FA Cup win against Tranmere Rovers; it was his first goal for United since March 2014. He then spent 20 months injured, finally returning to training and playing with the reserves in September 2021. In September 2021, Jones opened up on his injury problems, stating "I think as a footballer, as a person, as a human being, that's the lowest I probably ever felt in my life". Following an injury to Harry Maguire, coupled with existing injuries to Eric Bailly and Victor Lindelöf, Jones made his return to first team action in a 1–0 home defeat to Wolverhampton Wanderers on 3 January 2022, his first appearance in nearly two years. Jones last appearance for the club came when he was substituted on in a 3–0 home win against Brentford on 2 May 2022. Following the appointment of Erik ten Hag, Jones wasn't included in United's 25 man squad for the 2022–23 season; injury resulted in Jones missing the entirety of the season.

On 15 May 2023, United announced that, after a 12-year stint at Old Trafford, Jones would be released by the club at the end of the season. Later that year, in September, he became involved in United's youth teams training sessions at Carrington, as he then announced plans to take courses to earn his coaching badges.

In August 2024, he announced his retirement from playing football, saying that he wanted to move into coaching. In total, he made 229 appearances for United, out of which 169 came in the Premier League. Prior to his retirement, he and David de Gea were the only remaining members of the 2012–13 squad that had won the Premier League in Sir Alex Ferguson's last season as manager.

== International career ==
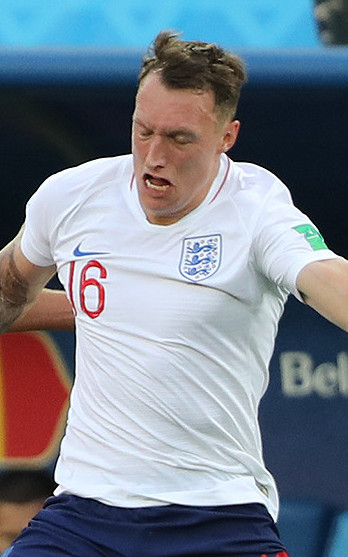
Jones playing for England at the 2018 FIFA World Cup

Jones made his debut for the England under-19 team in the 3–1 win over Turkey on 17 November 2009. He appeared a further three times for the under-19s. On 4 August 2010, Jones was called up to the England under-21 squad. On 10 August, Jones won his first under-21 cap, starting for England against Uzbekistan. He was substituted in the 46th minute and was replaced by Liverpool's Martin Kelly. He was selected for the 2011 UEFA European Under-21 Championship in Denmark and was made captain by manager Stuart Pearce for the final group stage match against the Czech Republic.

On 5 August 2011, he was called up to the England senior team for the friendly against the Netherlands by Fabio Capello, but did not end up playing as the match was cancelled four days later by the Football Association after riots in London. On 7 October 2011, Jones made his debut for the England senior team in a 2–2 draw against Montenegro in UEFA Euro 2012 qualifying. After the match, Capello said Jones was "born with talent", and praised his performance. Jones was named in England's UEFA Euro 2012 squad by Capello's replacement Roy Hodgson. However, he did not make an appearance during the tournament.

On 12 May 2014, Jones was named in England's 23-man squad for the 2014 FIFA World Cup. Due to a shoulder injury, Hodgson took uncapped defender John Stones as standby for Jones, but he recovered before 2 June deadline. With England's elimination confirmed, Jones was given a tournament debut as a starter in the final group match, helping the team to a clean sheet in a dead rubber 0–0 draw with Costa Rica in Belo Horizonte.

He was named in the 23-man England national team squad for the 2018 FIFA World Cup. He played two matches, both in losses against Belgium in the group stage and third place play-off.

== Coaching career ==
At the beginning of the 2023–24 season, Jones began a coaching role, working with the under-14 and under-18 teams in the Manchester United academy.

On 13 February 2026, Jones returned to Blackburn Rovers as a first-team coach following the appointment of Michael O'Neill as head coach.

In September 2025 he graduated in the inaugural cohort of students from the PFA Business School, with a Diploma in Sport Directorship from the University of Portsmouth. On 11 June 2026, Blackburn announced he had left to pursue another opportunity.

On 17 June 2026, Jones joined Championship club Sheffield United in the position of first-team coach.

== Player profile ==
=== Style of play ===
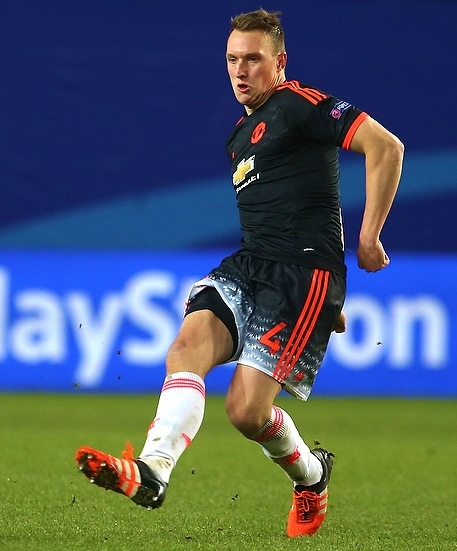
Jones playing for Manchester United in 2015

Known for his physical power and build, Jones has been called a "jack of all trades" for his ability to play at centre-back, right-back or as a defensive midfielder. Despite the suggestion that his best position is centre-back, he often filled in at right-back. With his stocky build, opposition players found it hard to bully Jones off the ball or out-muscle him. His commitment and dedication often made him a difficult opponent to play against, despite his limited technical ability.

=== Reception ===
Former Manchester United player Bobby Charlton has said that Jones evoked memories of the late Duncan Edwards, "If you talk to Bobby Charlton", says Paddy Crerand, Charlton's teammate in United's 1967–68 European Cup-winning team, "Phil Jones reminds him of Duncan Edwards with his power and build."

In 2011, England manager Fabio Capello compared Jones to former A.C. Milan and Italy captain Franco Baresi, and former Real Madrid and Spain captain Fernando Hierro.

In 2013, Manchester United manager Alex Ferguson offered perhaps the most glowing endorsement of Jones' abilities, saying "The way he is looking, he could be our best ever player. He may be one of the best players we have ever had, no matter where we play him. At 21 years of age, he is going to be a phenomenal player. He can play anywhere on the pitch. He has such a massive influence, with his instinct and reading of the game."

Later assessments of Jones' style were less flattering, with former Manchester United captain Roy Keane deeming Jones "not good at defending or [a] good defender". Jones was described by The Athletic as "someone who has become a running joke for football's LOL generation". In 2019, reflecting on Ferguson's 2013 endorsement of Jones, i noted that "in more than six years Jones has produced more internet memes, as he falls flat on his face or it contorts in an impossible expression, than convincing performances in a Manchester United shirt", while suggesting Ferguson's comments "could well be the biggest error of judgement he ever made in his career". Jones has often defended his career and has extensively talked about the toll the expectations placed on him took on his mental health. He has also stated that despite having achieved his dreams for playing for Blackburn and winning several trophies at United, he often faced insensitive and rude abuse online as well as offline.

== Career statistics ==
=== Club ===
Appearances and goals by club, season and competition
Club	Season	League			FA Cup		League Cup		Europe		Other		Total	
Club	Season	Division	Apps	Goals	Apps	Goals	Apps	Goals	Apps	Goals	Apps	Goals	Apps	Goals
Blackburn Rovers	2009–10	Premier League	9	0	1	0	2	0	—		—		12	0
Blackburn Rovers	2010–11	Premier League	26	0	0	0	2	0	—		—		28	0
Blackburn Rovers	Total		35	0	1	0	4	0	—		—		40	0
Manchester United	2011–12	Premier League	29	1	1	0	1	0	9 (Note: Six appearances and one goal in UEFA Champions League, three appearances in UEFA Europa League)	1	1 (Note: Appearance in FA Community Shield)	0	41	2
Manchester United	2012–13	Premier League	17	0	4	0	0	0	3 (Note: Appearances in UEFA Champions League)	0	—		24	0
Manchester United	2013–14	Premier League	26	1	0	0	4	1	8	1	1	0	39	3
Manchester United	2014–15	Premier League	22	0	2	0	0	0	—		—		24	0
Manchester United	2015–16	Premier League	10	0	0	0	1	0	2	0	—		13	0
Manchester United	2016–17	Premier League	18	0	2	0	3	0	3 (Note: Appearances in UEFA Europa League)	0	0	0	26	0
Manchester United	2017–18	Premier League	23	0	2	0	0	0	0	0	0	0	25	0
Manchester United	2018–19	Premier League	18	0	2	0	1	0	3	0	—		24	0
Manchester United	2019–20	Premier League	2	0	1	1	2	0	3	0	—		8	1
Manchester United	2020–21	Premier League	0	0	0	0	0	0	0	0	—		0	0
Manchester United	2021–22	Premier League	4	0	1	0	0	0	0	0	—		5	0
Manchester United	2022–23	Premier League	0	0	0	0	0	0	0	0	—		0	0
Manchester United	Total		169	2	15	1	12	1	31	2	2	0	229	6
Career total			204	2	16	1	16	1	31	2	2	0	269	6

=== International ===
Appearances and goals by national team and year
National team	Year	Apps	Goals
England	2011	3	0
England	2012	2	0
England	2013	4	0
England	2014	4	0
England	2015	7	0
England	2016	0	0
England	2017	4	0
England	2018	3	0
Total		27	0

== Honours ==
Manchester United

- Premier League: 2012–13
- FA Cup: 2015–16; runner-up: 2017–18
- FA Community Shield: 2011, 2013
- UEFA Europa League: 2016–17
