= Whitehorse Manor Junior School =

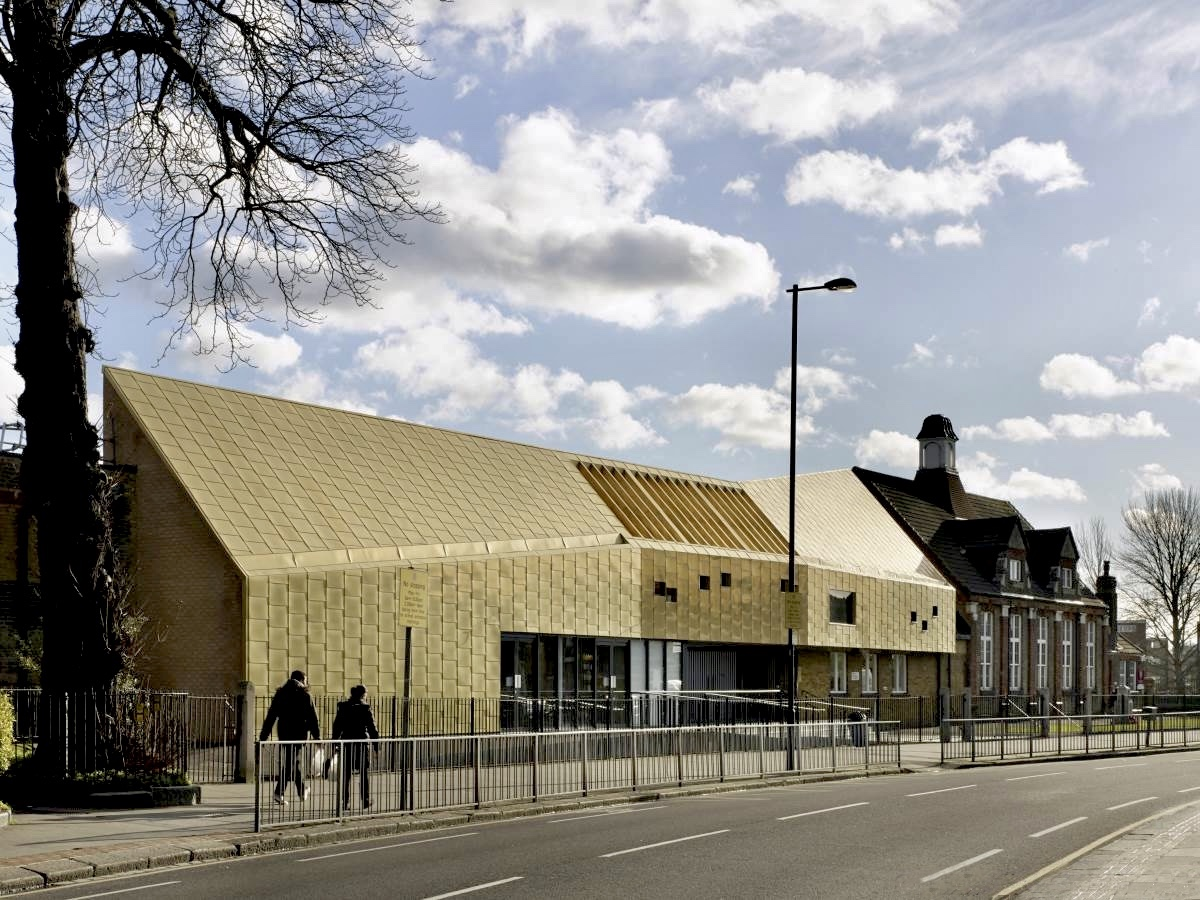
- Additions to façade at Whitehorse Manor Schools looking South East

Location
- Whitehorse Road; Thornton Heath, Greater London, CR7 8SB; England; 51°23′46″N 0°05′31″W

Information
- Type: Academy
- Department for Education URN: 136565 Tables
- Ofsted: Reports
- Head teacher: Nina Achenbach
- Gender: Coeducational
- Age: 7 to 11
- Enrolment: 480
- Website: www.pegasusacademytrust.org

Whitehorse Manor Junior School is a junior school for pupils aged between seven and eleven years. The school is in Thornton Heath. In April 2011 the school became part of the first Academy Trust in Croydon and the running of the school became part of the responsibility of the Pegasus Academy Trust, a public company limited by guarantee. The executive headteachers of the Pegasus Academy Trust are Jolyon Roberts and Lynne Sampson. The head of school is Nina Achenbach.

The school caters for pupils from Year 3 to Year 6. The school is expanding the number of forms on entry from two to three. There are currently 450 pupils on roll with a maximum of 30 pupils in each of 15 classes. To cater for these extra children, a major building project took place between 2010 and 2014 providing seven extra classrooms, new offices, extended hall and library. The scheme was designed by the architects Hayhurst and Co and won a RIBA London award in May 2014. In 2014 the school opened an annexe about two-thirds of a mile (1.1 km) away, Whitehorse Manor - Brigstock site, which allows another 210 children to be educated by the school, as the original site is full.

== History ==
The school was opened in 1892 and has undergone multiple re-organisations. Dr Ron Cox, a consultant archivist to the Education Department of the London Borough of Croydon, lists the chronological story as follows:

- 1892-1911
  Three schools (apart from the infants) opened on the Whitehorse Road site: Whitehorse Road Junior (Mixed) school, Whitehorse Road Senior boys' school, Whitehorse Road Senior girls' school.
- 1911-1930
  In 1911 Whitehorse Road Junior (Mixed) school closed and the pupils moved into the respective boys and girls departments of the two senior schools, therefore, giving Whitehorse Road (Post-Infants) boys' school and Whitehorse Road (Post-Infants) girls' school. In 1921 as part of a general re-organisation of school names the Whitehorse Road schools were re-designated "Whitehorse Manor".
- 1930-1955
  In 1930 there was a substantial re-organisation. All the Whitehorse Manor senior girls moved to another local school, Ecclesbourne, and all the Ecclesbourne senior boys moved to Whitehorse Manor. All the Whitehorse Manor junior boys moved to Ecclesbourne and all the Ecclesbourne junior girls moved to Whitehorse Manor. On the Whitehorse Manor site, this left Whitehorse Manor Senior (later secondary modern) boys' school and Whitehorse Manor Junior girls' school.
- 1955-1961
  In 1955, the headmaster of the boys school during this period was Mr Pavey who had returned from retirement.
- 1961 to 2011
  in 1961 both the boys and girls school amalgamated and have been mixed ever since
- From April 2011
  The school became part of the Pegasus Academy Trust.

Agnes Mason, an associate of D. H. Lawrence, taught at this school for some years until Davidson Road School opened in 1907 when she went there to teach with Lawrence. Helen Corke's autobiography gives a description of the school and its staff at that time.

== Headteachers ==
The Headteachers of the school have been:

Whitehorse Manor Junior School 1892-1911

From	To	Headteacher
4 July 1892	26 August 1911	Amelia Corney

Headteachers of Whitehorse Manor Senior Girls' School 1892-1961

From	To	Headteacher
14 June 1892	31 March 1903	Mary A Smyth
1 April 1903	31 August 1905	Lily Thornton
1 September 1905	30 September 1916	Annie Ada Malin
1 Oct 1916	31 Dec 1919	Ethel M Mayhew
1 Jan 1920	31 Dec 1934	Lily Crittenden
1 January 1935	31 December 1957	Miss M.H Stafford
1 January 1958	31 March 1961	Joan C. Grunberg (Acting)

Headteachers of Whitehorse Manor Senior Boys' School 1892-1955

From	To	Headteacher
14 June 1892	31 Dec 1900	William Hooper
1 January 1901	31 August 1911	James Boys Edwards
1 September 1911	31 December 1919	William Field
1 January 1920	31 Jan 1945	Samuel J Cook
1 February 1945	31 August 1955	Alfred Gregory

After spending some years as Headteacher of Sydenham Junior Boys Alfred Gregory returned as Headteacher of the new Junior (Mixed) school in 1961

Headteachers of Whitehorse Manor Junior (Mixed) School

From	To	Headteacher
1 April 1961	31 August 1971	Alfred Gregory
1 September 1971	31 December 1983	Ernest Morgan
1 January 1984	31 August 1989	Mr Di Davis
1 September 1989	31 December 1989	Teresa McBain (Acting)
1 January 1990	22 April 1990	Mrs P Griffiths (Acting)
23 April 1990	30 April 1993	Yvonne Stewart
1 May 1993	31 August 1993	Teresa McBain (Acting)
1 September 1993	31 December 2000	Frances McGregor
1 January 2001	18 April 2004	Alexander Clark
19 April 2004	31 August 2011	Jolyon Roberts

In April 2011 the school became part of the Pegasus Academy Trust, with Whitehorse Manor Infant School and Ecclesbourne Primary School. The executive headteachers of The Pegasus Academy Trust are Jolyon Roberts and Lynne Sampson.

Head of School of Whitehorse Manor Junior (Academy) School

From	To	Head of School
1 September 2011	(Present)	Nina Achenbach

== Notable former pupils ==
- Wilfried Zaha, international footballer (Crystal Palace, England and Ivory Coast)

== Gallery ==
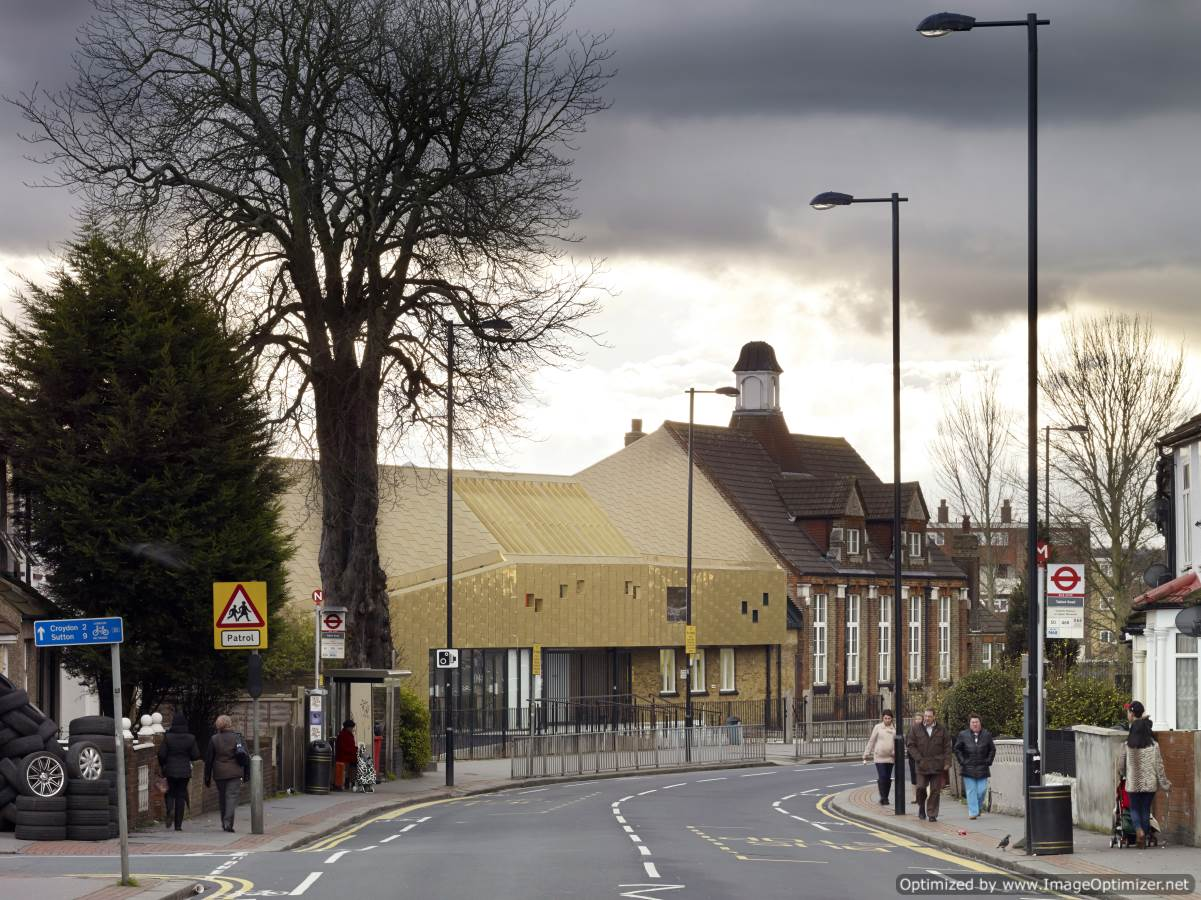
New Whitehorse Schools facade showing streetscape

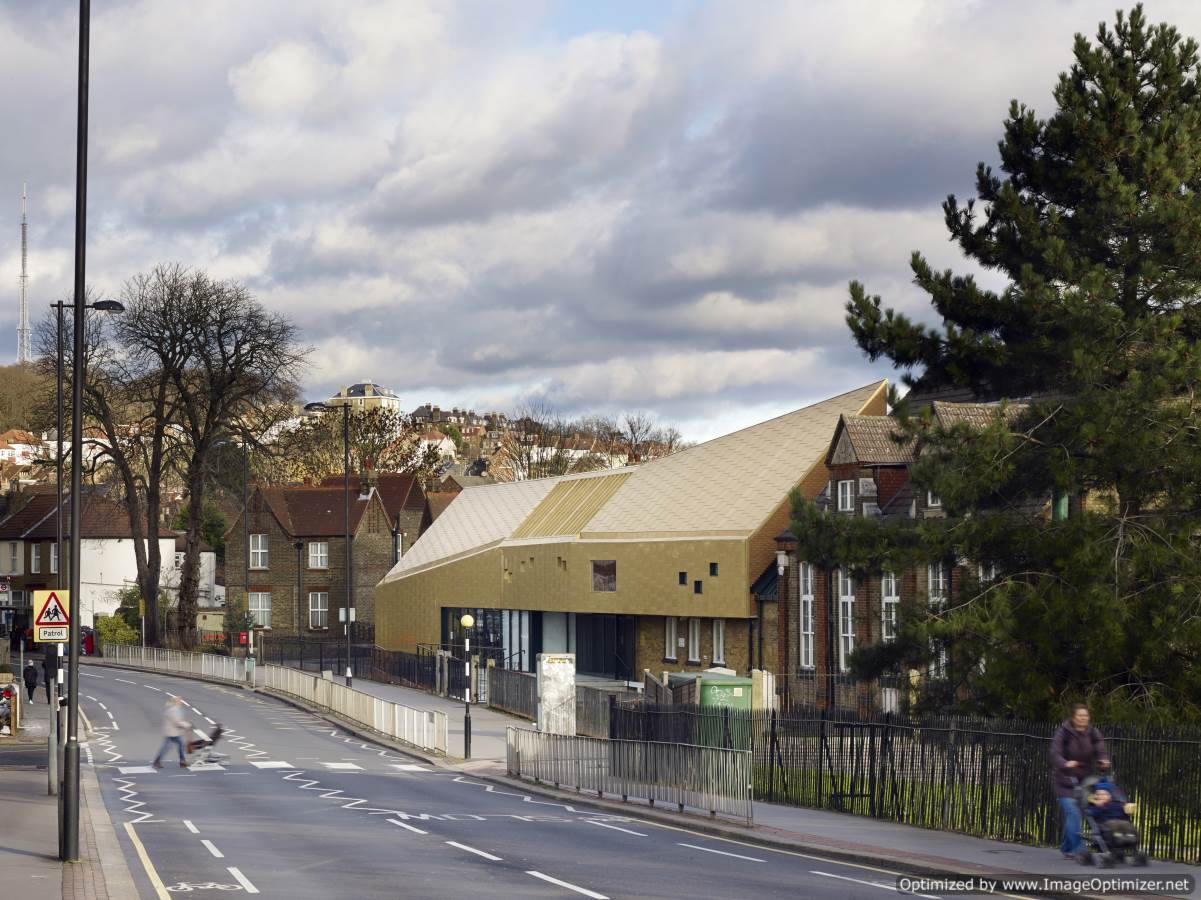
Whitehorse Manor Schools looking North
