= 2013 FA Community Shield =

- The match programme cover
Manchester United	Wigan Athletic
2	0
- Date: 11 August 2013
- Venue: Wembley Stadium, London
- Man of the Match: Michael Carrick (Manchester United)
- Referee: Mark Clattenburg (County Durham)
- Attendance: 80,235

The 2013 FA Community Shield (also known as The FA Community Shield sponsored by McDonald's for sponsorship reasons) was the 91st FA Community Shield, played on 11 August 2013 at Wembley Stadium, between the winners of the previous season's Premier League and FA Cup competitions. The match was contested by the champions of the 2012–13 Premier League, Manchester United, and the 2012–13 FA Cup winners, Wigan Athletic. Following Wigan's relegation to the Football League Championship just days after their cup triumph, it was the first time a team from outside the top flight had featured in the Community Shield since West Ham United in 1980.

Manchester City were the holders, having won the 2012 edition, but did not qualify for this match, as they finished second in the Premier League and lost the FA Cup final.

Manchester United won the Shield for a record 16th time outright and 20th time overall after a 2–0 win over Wigan, with Robin van Persie scoring both goals. This season's Shield was notable for being David Moyes' only honour as Manchester United manager, in what was his first competitive match in charge of the club following the retirement of Sir Alex Ferguson at the end of the 2012–13 season.

== Match ==
=== Details ===
11 August 2013
14:00 BST

Manchester United	2–0	Wigan Athletic
Van Persie 6', 59'	Report

Wembley Stadium, London
Attendance: 80,235
Referee: Mark Clattenburg (County Durham)

Manchester United	Wigan Athletic

GK	1	(Spain) David de Gea
RB	2	(Brazil) Rafael		(substituted off) 16'
CB	15	(Serbia) Nemanja Vidić (c)
CB	4	(England) Phil Jones
LB	3	(France) Patrice Evra
CM	23	(England) Tom Cleverley	(yellow card) 90+1'
CM	16	(England) Michael Carrick
CM	11	(Wales) Ryan Giggs		(substituted off) 67'
RW	29	(England) Wilfried Zaha		(substituted off) 61'
LW	19	(England) Danny Welbeck		(substituted off) 83'
CF	20	(Netherlands) Robin van Persie		(substituted off) 83'
Substitutes:
GK	13	(Denmark) Anders Lindegaard
DF	6	(Northern Ireland) Jonny Evans
DF	12	(England) Chris Smalling		(substituted on) 16'
MF	8	(Brazil) Anderson		(substituted on) 67'
MF	25	(Ecuador) Antonio Valencia		(substituted on) 61'
MF	26	(Japan) Shinji Kagawa		(substituted on) 83'
MF	44	(Belgium) Adnan Januzaj		(substituted on) 83'
Manager:
(Scotland) David Moyes

GK	1	(England) Scott Carson
RB	17	(Barbados) Emmerson Boyce (c)
CB	24	(England) James Perch
CB	25	(England) Leon Barnett
LB	3	(Scotland) Stephen Crainey
CM	4	(Republic of Ireland) James McCarthy		(substituted off) 86'
CM	8	(England) Ben Watson		(substituted off) 71'
CM	16	(Scotland) James McArthur	(yellow card) 50'	(substituted off) 61'
RW	10	(Scotland) Shaun Maloney		(substituted off) 71'
LW	11	(Republic of Ireland) James McClean		(substituted off) 61'
CF	9	(England) Grant Holt		(substituted off) 61'
Substitutes:
GK	13	(England) Lee Nicholls
MF	7	(Republic of Ireland) Chris McCann		(substituted on) 61'
MF	14	(Spain) Jordi Gómez		(substituted on) 71'
MF	18	(Honduras) Roger Espinoza	(yellow card) 88'	(substituted on) 71'
MF	29	(France) Nouha Dicko		(substituted on) 86'
FW	15	(England) Callum McManaman		(substituted on) 61'
FW	32	(France) Marc-Antoine Fortuné		(substituted on) 61'
Manager:
(Republic of Ireland) Owen Coyle

Man of the match

- Michael Carrick (Manchester United)

Match officials

- Assistant referees:
  - Mike Mullarkey (Devon)
  - Scott Ledger (South Yorkshire)
- Fourth official: Michael Oliver (Northumberland)
- Reserve official: Lee Betts (Norfolk)

Match rules

- 90 minutes.
- Penalty shoot-out if scores level after 90 minutes.
- Seven named substitutes.
- Maximum of six substitutions.

== See also ==
- 2006 Football League Cup Final
- 2012–13 Premier League
- 2012–13 FA Cup
