= 2008–09 Manchester United F.C. season =

English football club season

Manchester United F.C.
2008–09 season
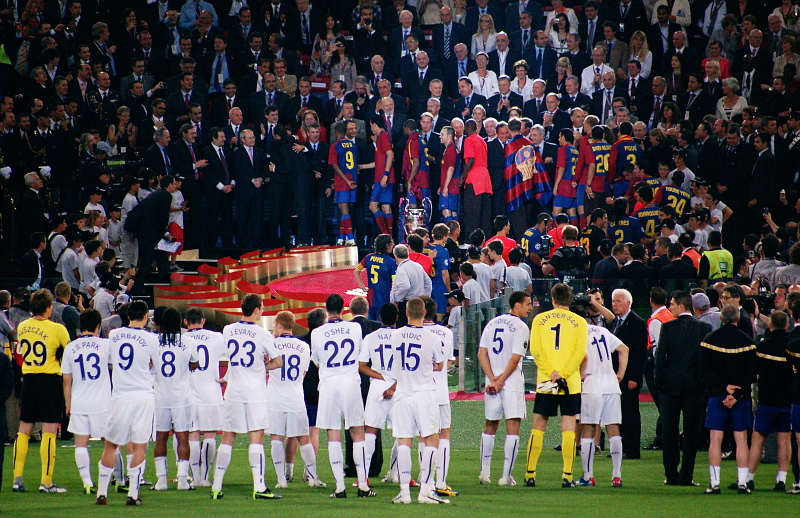
- United players look on after their defeat in the 2009 UEFA Champions League final
- Co-chairmen: Joel and Avram Glazer
- Manager: Sir Alex Ferguson
- Stadium: Old Trafford
- Premier League: 1st
- FA Cup: Semi-finals
- League Cup: Winners
- UEFA Champions League: Runners-up
- FA Community Shield: Winners
- UEFA Super Cup: Runners-up
- FIFA Club World Cup: Winners
- Top goalscorer: League: Cristiano Ronaldo (18); All: Cristiano Ronaldo (26)
- Highest home attendance: 75,569 (vs. Liverpool, 14 March)
- Lowest home attendance: 53,729 (vs. Middlesbrough, 23 September)
- Average home league attendance: 75,304
Home colours	Away colours	Third colours

The 2008–09 season was Manchester United's 17th season in the Premier League, and their 34th consecutive season in the top division of English football. The club won a third consecutive Premier League title for the second time to equal Liverpool's record of 18 league titles. United also reached the Champions League final, aiming to become the first team since Milan to defend the European Cup (and be the first team to do so in the Champions League era), but lost 2–0 to Barcelona.

United started their season in August 2008 by winning the Community Shield, beating FA Cup winners Portsmouth on penalties after a goalless draw. As winners of the UEFA Champions League, they earned the right to play Zenit Saint Petersburg, the winners of the UEFA Cup, in the UEFA Super Cup, where they lost 2–1. They also qualified for the FIFA Club World Cup, entering at the semi-finals. The club went on to win the competition, becoming the first English side to do so after beating LDU Quito 1–0 in the final. Two months later, on 1 March 2009, the club added the 2008–09 League Cup to their trophy cabinet after beating title holders Tottenham Hotspur on penalties after a goalless 120 minutes in the final.

United secured the Premier League title with a goalless draw at home to Arsenal on 16 May 2009. This made them the first team to win three consecutive English top flight titles on two occasions, having also done so between 1999 and 2001.

This was Cristiano Ronaldo's final season with Manchester United before leaving for Real Madrid for a world record transfer fee in June 2009; he returned at the start of the 2021–22 season.

== Pre-season and friendlies ==
After losing assistant manager Carlos Queiroz to the Portugal national team, Manchester United began their pre-season schedule on 12 July 2008 with a trip up to Pittodrie Stadium to play against Sir Alex Ferguson's former team, Aberdeen. The fixture was to celebrate the 25th anniversary of the Dons winning the European Cup Winners' Cup, for which Ferguson himself was the manager. Manchester United won the match 2–0, with a penalty from Michael Carrick and a header from Wayne Rooney.

The team then left for South Africa to play in the 2008 Vodacom Challenge. The tournament began with United drawing 1–1 with Kaizer Chiefs in Cape Town, before moving on to Durban to play against Orlando Pirates three days later; they won the match 1–0. On 24 July, the Kaizer Chiefs beat the Orlando Pirates in Port Elizabeth and were rewarded with a further fixture against Manchester United in Pretoria on 26 July. United won the match 4–0 to take the Vodacom Challenge, with goals from Ryan Giggs, Wayne Rooney, Tom Cleverley and Fraizer Campbell.

En route back from South Africa, United stopped off in Abuja, Nigeria, on 27 July, where they achieved a 2–1 friendly win over Portsmouth, with goals from Chris Eagles and Carlos Tevez. Coincidentally, this was a "dress rehearsal" for the Community Shield on 10 August. It was also United's first trip to Nigeria, the location of the club's fourth-largest fan base, with 13.6 million supporters. Upon their return from Africa, the Manchester United team was involved in Ole Gunnar Solskjær's testimonial on 2 August 2008. The match, played at Old Trafford against RCD Espanyol, was won by United 1–0. The winner was scored in the 82nd minute by Fraizer Campbell. This match was followed by two more friendlies; first, a 2–0 win over Peterborough United, managed by Sir Alex's son and former United player Darren, on 4 August at London Road Stadium, and then a 0–0 draw against Italian giants Juventus at Old Trafford on 6 August.

Date	Opponents	H / A	Result F–A	Scorers	Attendance
12 July 2008	Aberdeen	A	2–0	Carrick 45' (pen.), Rooney 70'	22,192
19 July 2008	Kaizer Chiefs	N	1–1	Eagles 60'	
22 July 2008	Orlando Pirates	N	1–0	Martin 23'	50,000
26 July 2008	Kaizer Chiefs	N	4–0	Giggs 40', Rooney 57', Cleverley 62', Campbell 86'	
27 July 2008	Portsmouth	N	2–1	Eagles 50', Tevez 65'	
2 August 2008	Espanyol	H	1–0	Campbell 82'	68,868
4 August 2008	Peterborough United	A	2–0	R. Martin 38' (o.g.), Gibson 68'	13,042
6 August 2008	Juventus	H	0–0		69,872

== FA Community Shield ==
The Red Devils retained the 2008 FA Community Shield 3–1 on penalties against 2007–08 FA Cup winners Portsmouth after the match finished 0–0 after 90 minutes on 10 August. It was United's second game against Portsmouth in the space of two weeks.

Date	Opponents	H / A	Result F–A	Scorers	Attendance
10 August 2008	Portsmouth	N	0–0 (3–1p)		84,808

== UEFA Super Cup ==
At the end of August, after the start of the Premier League season, United, as the winners of the 2007–08 UEFA Champions League, travelled to Monaco for the 2008 UEFA Super Cup against UEFA Cup winners Zenit St. Petersburg. However, they went 2–0 down in the first hour of the game, and a Nemanja Vidić goal was not enough to save them from defeat. A Paul Scholes handball in the 90th minute resulted in his second yellow card of the game, meaning that he would miss the Red Devils' opening UEFA Champions League match against Villarreal.

Date	Opponents	H / A	Result F–A	Scorers	Attendance
29 August 2008	Zenit Saint Petersburg	N	1–2	Vidić 73'	18,064

== Premier League ==
Manchester United kicked off their defence of the Premier League title on 17 August 2008, playing against Newcastle United at Old Trafford. Newcastle got the first goal of the game through an Obafemi Martins header, but United hit straight back through Darren Fletcher two minutes later. Alex Ferguson handed debuts to both Rodrigo Possebon and Rafael during the game. This was followed up by a narrow 1–0 win over Portsmouth on 25 August. Papa Bouba Diop went close for Portsmouth after just 12 seconds, before United opened the scoring in the 32nd minute, Darren Fletcher's scuffed shot deflecting off Sol Campbell before being turned into the roof of the net by Sylvain Distin. United dominated most of the match, with Portsmouth rarely testing Edwin van der Sar in the United goal.

On 13 September, United travelled to Anfield to play Liverpool, who handed them their first loss of the Premier League season. United got off to a strong start with Carlos Tevez scoring in the third minute, but an own goal by Wes Brown in the 27th minute and a goal by Liverpool winger Ryan Babel in the 77th sealed United's fate. The game saw the debut of Dimitar Berbatov, who had signed from Tottenham Hotspur on 1 September; the Bulgarian marked his first appearance by providing the assist for Tevez's goal. The defeat was United's first against Liverpool in the Premier League since 2004. Following the loss at Anfield, United faced the daunting task of travelling to Stamford Bridge to play Chelsea. As in the previous game, United opened the scoring, with Park Ji-sung scoring in the 18th minute after Chelsea's Petr Čech parried Berbatov's shot into the Korean's path. United held on until the 80th minute, when Mikel John Obi's free kick found the head of Salomon Kalou, who headed in the equaliser.

United gave their league season a kick-start with a 2–0 win over Bolton Wanderers on 27 September. Bolton took the game to United early on in the first half, but the tide began to slowly shift back into United's favour; only the heroics of Bolton goalkeeper Jussi Jääskeläinen kept the visitors in the game going into half-time, although Fabrice Muamba did shoot wide from eight yards out just before the whistle. The United breakthrough came 15 minutes into the second half, when referee Rob Styles awarded the home side a penalty, despite Jlloyd Samuel's challenge on Cristiano Ronaldo appearing to have been a fair one; Ronaldo converted the penalty himself. In the 71st minute, Paul Scholes came on for Anderson to make his 400th Premier League appearance, while Carlos Tevez was replaced by Wayne Rooney. Not long afterwards, Rooney doubled the Reds' lead and secured the win with an unstoppable shot after being played in by a Ronaldo back-heel.

The Red Devils then made the short trip up to Ewood Park the following weekend to take on Blackburn Rovers. Wayne Rooney declared himself fit after having picked up a knock against Aalborg BK in midweek, and was the orchestrator of most of United's attacks, including the one that led to the opening goal. Rooney took the return pass from his own short corner before swinging the ball into the Blackburn penalty area, where it was met by the head of Wes Brown and passed between the upright and the player who was supposed to be guarding it. The Blackburn players believed that the goal should not have been allowed to stand, as Nemanja Vidić impeded goalkeeper Jason Brown from getting to the ball, but referee Steve Bennett allowed it to stand. Rooney himself scored United's second goal halfway through the second half, latching on to Cristiano Ronaldo's pull-back and curling it past Brown from 12 yards. Carlos Tevez hit the post with a late strike, but the score remained at 2–0 at full-time, pushing United up the table to sixth place.

After a week off for international duty, United returned to action on 18 October with a home match against West Bromwich Albion. The Baggies started off in a disciplined fashion, but were unable to prevent the in-form Wayne Rooney from putting the ball in the back of the net after 21 minutes. However, the goal was ruled out by referee Mark Halsey after he deemed Rooney to have pushed a West Brom defender to the floor before shooting past Scott Carson. Neither team found the back of the net again before half-time, but Rooney soon scored a legal goal ten minutes into the second half, picking up a long through pass from Berbatov out on the left wing before cutting back into the penalty area and firing a near-post shot through Ryan Donk's legs and past the goalkeeper. The home side then scored two goals in quick succession, Ronaldo shooting through Carson's legs for the first before Berbatov stabbed home his first League goal for United following a cross from substitute Nani. Nani himself then added a fourth goal for the Red Devils in the 90th minute, celebrating in his usual flamboyant style. The win propelled United up to 4th place in the Premier League table, the first time they had been in the top four that season.

A trip to Goodison Park to play Everton followed on 25 October, with Alex Ferguson preferring to stick with Rooney and Berbatov up front, leaving Tevez on the bench. United had the run of the play in the first half, and after Darren Fletcher scored from a late run into the box in the 22nd minute, they began to treat the match as somewhat of an exhibition, with Everton hardly able to get a look in. However, United were unable to add to their tally and Everton came back with added resolve after the interval. United were rocked by Everton's new-found physicality, and the Liverpudlians equalised in the 66th minute through Marouane Fellaini, who headed home Phil Neville's cross after an uncharacteristic lapse in concentration from Rio Ferdinand. Ferdinand was again at fault a minute later, but Edwin van der Sar saved his blushes by saving from Yakubu in a one-on-one situation. Wayne Rooney was booked later for inciting the fans, and he was immediately substituted. The match finished at 1–1, a result that United will look on as two points dropped, but deserved for not having killed the game off earlier.

On 29 October, United hosted West Ham United. Unlike other opposing teams that season, the Hammers struggled to cope with the tempo set by the home side from the word "go", and Dimitar Berbatov almost opened the scoring after just two minutes, only to see his shot deflected over by Matthew Upson. The scoresheet did not remain blank for much longer, however, as Nani received the ball on the left wing after United had spent a prolonged spell inside the West Ham box, before crossing for Ronaldo who scored with a left-footed shot to the far post. Ronaldo doubled his tally 15 minutes later, although he would have found it more difficult to miss the target after Berbatov got past James Collins with a wonderful piece of skill on the goal line. United continued to threaten Robert Green in the West Ham goal, but they did not add to their tally.

United went into their 1 November match at home to Premier League newcomers Hull City two points behind their visitors in the league table, a position they would not have expected to find themselves in at the start of the season. Nevertheless, the Red Devils took the game to the Tigers from the kick-off, with Ronaldo opening the scoring after just three minutes. Laying the ball off to Dimitar Berbatov, the Portuguese controlled the Bulgarian's return ball 12 yards from goal before sweeping the ball in off the post with his left foot. Hull equalised in the 23rd minute, but Michael Carrick restored United's lead on the half-hour, also shooting in off the post with his left foot. Ronaldo extended the lead just before half-time, heading in from Nani's corner. The story after half-time was much the same, as Nemanja Vidić added a fourth from a corner that never should have reached him. However, Hull responded through Bernard Mendy, whose lob over Edwin van der Sar crossed the line before Vidić could hook it away. They opened the game up again in the 82nd minute, with Geovanni converting a penalty awarded after Rio Ferdinand brought Mendy down, but their response came too late and the match finished 4–3 to United.

Manchester United travelled to Arsenal's Emirates Stadium the following weekend for a lunchtime kick-off. The match started at a high tempo, with United's players harassing the Arsenal contingent at every opportunity. Such harassment led to the first chance of the game, when Manuel Almunia was forced into handling Mikaël Silvestre's underhit backpass with Wayne Rooney bearing down on him. However, the resulting indirect free kick was cleared and Michael Carrick hit the rebound wide. It was Arsenal who opened the scoring, though, with Samir Nasri's 22nd-minute shot deflecting off Gary Neville and past Van der Sar. Nasri scored again just after half-time, almost bursting the net after being played in by Cesc Fàbregas, while United never really looked like threatening the Arsenal goal. Towards the end of the game, Michael Carrick accidentally caught Manuel Almunia with his boot as the Spanish goalkeeper bravely dropped on a loose ball, resulting in Almunia requiring several minutes of treatment. He attempted to carry on, but was soon replaced by Łukasz Fabiański. Rafael pulled a goal back for United in the final minute, but it was too little, too late for the Red Devils who swapped places with Arsenal in the league table, dropping back to fourth.

The club's next fixture was a home game against Stoke City on 15 November, the 50th anniversary of Alex Ferguson's first appearance in professional football for Queen's Park. Despite being without the injured Rio Ferdinand, Ryan Giggs and Wayne Rooney, United took the lead just three minutes into the match, with Cristiano Ronaldo hitting a dipping and swerving free kick past Thomas Sørensen in the middle of the Stoke goal for his 100th goal for Manchester United. United's second goal came in stoppage time at the end of the first half; Michael Carrick ghosted through the Stoke City defence and, with four defenders in close proximity, hit a powerful left-footed shot into the top corner of the net. Just minutes into the second half, United scored their third goal after Dimitar Berbatov controlled Carlos Tevez's cross with the outside of his foot before volleying home. In the 84th minute, Danny Welbeck picked up the ball on the edge of the centre circle in Stoke's half, played a one-two with Manucho and unleashed a swerving shot from 30 yards for his first Manchester United goal in his Premier League debut for the club. Five minutes later, Ronaldo scored from another free kick to round off a 5–0 victory for the home side. The result moved United up to third place.

United then travelled to Villa Park to play Aston Villa on 22 November. The tie ended a scoreless draw, the first time the Reds had failed to score a goal in a Premier League game since November 2007. United's next match took them crosstown to City of Manchester Stadium to play Manchester City on 30 November. The lone goal of the match came to United when a Michael Carrick shot rebounded off City keeper Joe Hart and was put in the back of the net by Wayne Rooney, giving him his 100th club goal and his 83rd at United. With the victory United increased their win total in the Manchester derby to 60 as compared to City's 41. Six days later, United faced Sunderland at home, with United winning thanks to Nemanja Vidić's goal in the first minute of second half stoppage time.

United's next match was against Tottenham Hotspur at White Hart Lane on 13 December. Despite chances for both sides, Spurs keeper Heurelho Gomes and Edwin van der Sar kept clean sheets for both sides. United then closed out the year with 1–0 wins over Stoke City at Britannia Stadium on 26 December and at home against Middlesbrough three days later, with Carlos Tevez scoring against Stoke and Dimitar Berbatov scoring against Boro.

United started 2009 with a crucial 3–0 win over Chelsea, putting them 1 point behind Chelsea and 5 points behind Liverpool, but they did have two games in hand. Ferguson surprised the crowd by starting Ryan Giggs ahead of Michael Carrick in central midfield, and the move paid off as Giggs was instrumental in the win. Both teams attacked in the first half, but forced few saves from either goalkeeper for the opening 30 minutes. In the 45th minute Wayne Rooney nudged the ball onto the pitch from a corner kick, before sauntering off, allowing Ryan Giggs to stroll casually over as if he was supposed to take the corner all along. Then, as Chelsea's players arranged themselves, presuming the ball to be out of play, Giggs crossed to Ronaldo who headed the ball home. However, the goal was disallowed. United retook the corner and scored through Berbatov's flick-on to Vidić who headed it in. Rooney stabbed the ball into the net after 63 minutes from a Patrice Evra cross and a Ronaldo backheel, while Berbatov completed the rout in the 86th minute from a cross from a Ronaldo free kick.

Following the win over Chelsea, United's next game was at home to Wigan. Rooney scored from less than six yards after just 54 seconds on a cross from Ronaldo, but hobbled off with a hamstring injury just a few minutes later. Tevez, who replaced Rooney, had a good chance after 20 minutes, rounding Chris Kirkland in the Wigan net, but his touch was too heavy and he failed to convert the chance. Wigan improved after the disastrous start, but neither side could find a goal and the match ended 1–0 to United. With this result, United climbed to 2nd (their highest position of the season so far) above Chelsea. They remained 2 points behind Liverpool, but having played one game fewer than the Merseysiders.

The Reds then travelled the short distance to Bolton Wanderers' Reebok Stadium on 17 January. Both sides remained scoreless after 89 minutes, with Bolton keeper Jussi Jääskeläinen making several terrific saves and Van der Sar challenged by a Fabrice Muamba long-range shot. Finally, Berbatov headed in a Tevez cross in the 90th minute. With the win, United extended their clean sheet record to 10, tying a record set by Chelsea in the 2004–05 season. Also with the victory, United gained three points, enough to reach the top spot of the Premier League table. This was the first time United had returned to the top spot since winning the 2007–08 Premier League title on 11 May 2008.

After a week off for domestic cup involvements, United returned to league action on 27 January with an away fixture at West Bromwich Albion. Despite having several players out through injury, Alex Ferguson was able to name a fairly strong starting XI, including a fit-again Rio Ferdinand, starting his first match since the 2008 FIFA Club World Cup Final in December. Both sides started the match in an attacking mindset, with United posing the slightly greater threat, and it was they who opened the scoring in the 22nd minute through Dimitar Berbatov; the Bulgarian exchanged passes with Michael Carrick before firing across Scott Carson into the far corner of the West Brom goal. Shortly before half-time, the Baggies were reduced to ten men when Paul Robinson was shown a straight red card for an innocuous-looking foul on Park Ji-sung. Their misery was compounded with almost the last kick of the half as Carson failed to hang on to a Ryan Giggs free kick, dropping the ball at the feet of Carlos Tevez, who lashed it home with his left foot. Nemanja Vidić added a third on the hour mark with a header from Giggs' corner, before Giggs set up another for Cristiano Ronaldo five minutes later. Ronaldo completed the scoring in the 73rd minute, shooting through Carson's legs after being put through by Berbatov, despite the West Brom players' protests that both Berbatov and Ronaldo had been offside during the build-up to the goal. The win took United three points clear of Liverpool, who were not to play until the following day, but the fact that they kept a clean sheet meant that they set a new Premier League record for consecutive clean sheets – with 11 – while Edwin van der Sar had not conceded in 1,032 minutes of football, surpassing Petr Čech's record of 1,025 minutes, set during the 2003–04 season.

After setting the Premier League clean sheet record against West Brom, Edwin van der Sar went into the following game against Everton knowing that if he kept the Toffees off the scoresheet for 72 minutes, he would also set a new clean sheet record for the entire English league – the previous record, set by Steve Death of Reading in 1979, stood at 1,104 minutes. In the end, he continued his flawless record for the entire 90 minutes as United recorded another 1–0 win. The first half was largely dominated by United, who saw strikes from Park Ji-sung and Carlos Tevez stopped by goalkeeper Tim Howard, while Cristiano Ronaldo hit the inside of the post with Howard beaten. The breakthrough came at the end of the first half, as Michael Carrick made his way into the box before being tripped by Mikel Arteta. Carrick attempted to stay on his feet, but when United were unable to gain an advantage, referee Mark Halsey pointed to the penalty spot; Ronaldo converted the resulting penalty kick to open the scoring. During the second half, Carrick looked to have won another penalty for United when he was knocked to the ground by Joleon Lescott, but Halsey turned away the Red Devils' appeals. Van der Sar was forced into a save from a 30-yard free kick by Arteta on the hour mark, but the shot never looked to be seriously troubling the goalkeeper. United continued to hold on for another 1–0 win to take them five points ahead of Liverpool and Chelsea, who were to play each other the following day. Liverpool won the match 2–0 with two late goals from Fernando Torres, which closed the gap between themselves and United to two points, although they had now played one more match than United.

Liverpool returned to the top of the table with a 3–2 away win over Portsmouth on 7 February, but they remained there for less than 24 hours as United recorded a 1–0 away win over West Ham to restore their two-point lead. West Ham came into the game off the back of a six-game unbeaten run, and it was they who had the better of the early chances; first, Lucas Neill had a shot from the edge of the area stopped by Edwin van der Sar, who then denied Carlton Cole as the English striker attempted to chip him from just inside the box. United settled into their characteristic passing rhythm, but the two sides went into half-time still at 0–0. Halfway through the second half, Ryan Giggs picked up a pass from Paul Scholes out on the left wing. He then took the ball round a sliding Carlton Cole and cut into the box, before curling a shot through a narrow gap and past Robert Green's outstretched left hand for the first goal of the game. The goal meant that Giggs maintained his record of having scored in every season of the Premier League since its inception. Cristiano Ronaldo was denied a penalty in the dying minutes of the game after he was tripped by Lucas Neill, and then he smashed a free kick into the chest of Scott Parker, but there were no further goals and United returned to the top of the table.

As a result of their qualification for the 2008 UEFA Super Cup, United's home fixture against Fulham, which was originally scheduled for the weekend of 30/31 August 2008, was eventually played on 18 February 2009. United went into the match, their game in hand over second-placed Liverpool, two points ahead of the Merseysiders and could extend their lead to five points with a win over Fulham. With this in mind, the Red Devils started well, and opened the scoring in the 12th minute through Paul Scholes; Michael Carrick picked out Scholes just outside the area with a pinpoint corner, and the veteran midfielder volleyed the ball goalwards. Fulham goalkeeper Mark Schwarzer got down to stop the shot, but the spin and pace on the ball took it over the line. Carlos Tevez had a goal ruled out for offside shortly after, before a Dimitar Berbatov strike was blocked on the line by Aaron Hughes, but the Bulgarian did end up doubling United's tally shortly before the half-hour, stealing in ahead of Schwarzer to convert John O'Shea's square cross. Berbatov had the ball in the net again on the stroke of half-time, but he was deemed to have been offside in the build-up. Wayne Rooney, returning from a seven-game absence due to a hamstring injury, was introduced on the hour, and scored with his first touch, poking home Park Ji-sung's misdirected shot across goal. Bobby Zamora came close to ending United's run of clean sheets in the closing stages, but his shot went narrowly wide and United held on to win 3–0.

The following weekend presented United with an opportunity to stretch their lead over Liverpool to eight points, as United played against Blackburn Rovers on the Saturday, while Liverpool would not play Manchester City until the Sunday. With one eye on the Champions League round of 16 tie against Internazionale the following Tuesday, Alex Ferguson rested Edwin van der Sar and Nemanja Vidić, and played Tomasz Kuszczak and Jonny Evans in their stead. Despite the defensive shake-up, United had the better of the early chances, with both Scholes and Ronaldo going close before Nani put Wayne Rooney through for the first goal in the 23rd minute. The Portuguese winger curled a through-pass round the back of the Blackburn defence, and although Ryan Nelsen got a toe to the ball, it was not enough to take it away from Rooney, who poked it past Paul Robinson in the Blackburn goal. However, the lead only lasted nine minutes, as Blackburn became the first team in more than 22 hours of football (1,334 minutes) to breach the Manchester United defence; after catching Nani in possession, André Ooijer played a through ball to Roque Santa Cruz, who took the ball round the sliding Rio Ferdinand and Tomasz Kuszczak and shot home from a narrowing angle. Jonny Evans looked to have restored United's lead on the stroke of half-time, but his header was ruled out after the referee deemed Cristiano Ronaldo to have impeded Ryan Nelsen. Nelsen himself almost gave Blackburn the lead shortly after the break, but his effort came back off the post, and the follow-up strike from El Hadji Diouf was saved by Kuszczak. In the end, though, it was United who regained the lead in the 60th minute; the Red Devils were awarded a free kick wide to the left of the penalty area, and, as usual, Cristiano Ronaldo stepped up to take it. Despite it looking like the angle was too narrow to strike at goal, the FIFA World Player of the Year hit a characteristic dipping shot over the wall and over the head of Paul Robinson to make the score 2–1. The scoreline remained the same for the next half-hour, and although it looked like Morten Gamst Pedersen may have been pulled back by Rafael in the penalty area late in the game, the referee deemed it not to be a foul and United held on for the win.

United's next game was played away against Newcastle United. Van der Sar was back in goal, having missed the previous two games (the league game against Blackburn and the League Cup Final against Tottenham Hotspur). However, his clean sheet record finally came to an end after just 9 minutes as Peter Løvenkrands opened the scoring for Newcastle. Obafemi Martins should have put Newcastle 2–0 up, but he slid his shot wide and was made to pay as Wayne Rooney slotted home midway through the first half, which ended 1–1. The game was slightly marred by two questionable challenges, late in the first half, by Newcastle's Steven Taylor, who first appeared to hit Cristiano Ronaldo with his arm and then, moments later, slid a dangerous tackle in on Michael Carrick. However, despite some anger from players such as Rio Ferdinand and Wayne Rooney, Taylor only received a single yellow card. The second half started brightly, and Dimitar Berbatov scored what proved to be the winner just before the hour mark after Taylor mis-hit a back-pass. Neither team could manage another goal and the game ended 2–1 to Manchester United.

The Reds' next league encounter saw the visit of Liverpool to Old Trafford, bringing the two main title contenders head-to-head. United started the match brightly and took the lead on 23 minutes when Park Ji-sung was brought down in the penalty area by Pepe Reina and referee Alan Wiley pointed to the spot, where Cristiano Ronaldo converted the penalty kick to Reina's right. The lead only lasted five minutes, however, as Nemanja Vidić failed to deal with a long ball from Liverpool's Martin Škrtel and Fernando Torres punished his error with a cool finish past Edwin van der Sar to level the scores. Things went from bad to worse for the hosts just before the break when Patrice Evra tripped Steven Gerrard in the penalty area, where Gerrard scored the resulting spot kick; Van der Sar went the right way, diving to his left, but the ball was out of his reach. After the break, United drove at Liverpool in an attempt to find an equaliser, but Vidić was sent off after hauling down Gerrard on the edge of the penalty area and Fábio Aurélio scored the subsequent free kick to give Liverpool a 3–1 lead. In injury time, Andrea Dossena took advantage of Reina's goal kick and chipped Van der Sar to score Liverpool's fourth and close the gap at the top of the table to four points.

United suffered a further setback when they lost their next league encounter against Fulham 2–0 at Craven Cottage, seeing the team's lead in the league cut to only a point. Paul Scholes was sent off in the 18th minute for handling the ball on the goal-line and Danny Murphy scored the resulting penalty. Despite strong pressure from United in the second half, following an unconvincing first-half display, Zoltán Gera scored a second goal for Fulham to seal the match. Wayne Rooney was also dismissed for two bookable offences and would subsequently miss the next match. This was the first time since 2005 that United had lost two consecutive league games.

On 5 April, after an international break, United faced Aston Villa at home. Cristiano Ronaldo scored an early first-half goal to give United the lead, only for John Carew to equalise after 30 minutes. After the break, Gabriel Agbonlahor headed the ball into the net to give Villa the lead. With United looking to avoid a third-straight Premier League defeat for the first time in four years, Ronaldo scored an equaliser on 80 minutes to set up a frantic finale to the match. Debutant Federico Macheda, who came on as a substitute, scored an injury-time winner for United and took them back to the top of the league after Liverpool had briefly led, having beaten Fulham 1–0 the day before.

The Reds' next game was away to a struggling Sunderland, which they won 2–1 thanks to another goal from Macheda. United took the lead through Paul Scholes' looping header from Wayne Rooney's cross on 19 minutes but Sunderland equalised on 55 minutes through Kenwyne Jones' bundled finish. United had created a few good chances to double their lead before Sunderland's goal, with Scholes and Rooney both shooting narrowly wide. However, with Sunderland trying to hold-on to a precious point, Macheda was introduced and within seconds had put United ahead. Michael Carrick had taken a shot which looked to be going wide, but Macheda was in the box, alongside other players, and he flicked his left foot towards the ball, directing it into Craig Gordon's bottom corner to give United the win and put them back to the top of the table again.

Liverpool's 4–4 draw with Arsenal on 22 April returned the Merseysiders to the top of the table, but only on goal difference, with United having two games in hand on their rivals. United had the chance, 24 hours later, to retake top spot with a home game against Portsmouth. United – who picked a team containing nine changes from the one that lost to Everton in the FA Cup semi-final – did not start very well and Portsmouth took the early possession, but following a good through-ball from Anderson, Ryan Giggs crossed for Wayne Rooney to score past England goalkeeper, David James to put United 1–0 up after just nine minutes. The remainder of the first half saw United squander a number of chances, the best of which being a goal-line clearance from a John O'Shea header. Portsmouth improved in the second half, although Edwin van der Sar was rarely troubled. It took until the 82nd minute for substitute Michael Carrick to score from a perfect through-ball from Paul Scholes, who was playing his 600th game for United. The second goal effectively killed the game and United finished comfortable 2–0 winners, taking them three points ahead of Liverpool.

United welcomed the visit of Tottenham Hotspur to Old Trafford for their next game, knowing that they had slipped down to second in the league on goal difference after Liverpool had beaten Hull City earlier in the day. What the Reds didn't welcome, however, was being 2–0 down at half-time, with Darren Bent and Luka Modrić having taken advantage of two showings of poor defending by United. Bent scored from close range just before the half-hour mark, finishing off a Vedran Ćorluka cross, having got the better of Rio Ferdinand. Within two minutes, Modrić had doubled Spurs' lead, scoring close in after Aaron Lennon's cross had beaten Ferdinand. After an uncharacteristically tame first half from United's perspective, they started the second better, with Carlos Tevez replacing Nani during the interval. United got a goal back twelve minutes after the restart, via a controversial penalty. Michael Carrick was fed through into the box, only to be brought down by Heurelho Gomes. Replays showed that Gomes actually touched the ball but despite the keeper's protests, referee Howard Webb pointed to the spot. Cristiano Ronaldo stepped up and dispatched the penalty down the centre of the goal. Ten minutes later, Wayne Rooney equalised in a less debatable fashion, hitting in a shot at Gomes' near post after Dimitar Berbatov and Rafael had combined well. Only one minute after equalising, United were ahead. Rooney created some space down the left wing and crossed the ball in to find Ronaldo's diving header. The comeback looked to be complete three minutes later when United went 4–2 up, with Rooney's shot only just crossing the line despite Jonathan Woodgate trying his best to keep it out with his torso. The Reds' onslaught had stunned Tottenham and to add insult to injury, ex-Spurs player Berbatov scored United's fifth eight minutes after Rooney's second. The Bulgarian's initial header was saved by Gomes but he followed it up and poked the ball in with his boot. A very important comeback, shadowing United's 5–3 turnaround against the same team in 2001, put them three points ahead of Liverpool with five games left.

Middlesbrough were up next for United, at the Riverside. A usually tricky game for the Reds ended with a comfortable 2–0 away win, thanks to goals either side of half-time. Ryan Giggs opened the scoring with his first goal since being named as PFA Player of the Year, and his 98th Premier League goal in total. Giggs received the ball from Nemanja Vidić, steadied himself, and slotted it past Brad Jones' left hand from the edge of the area with 25 minutes played. United created a handful of chances in the remainder of the first half but none worried Boro's Australian goalkeeper. Park Ji-sung doubled the Reds' lead though shortly after half-time. Giggs and Federico Macheda combined with a one-two before Wayne Rooney threaded a pass through the Boro defence to find Park superbly. Park then settled the game with a decisive strike low into the bottom corner.

It was derby day next up for United as Manchester City made the short trip to Old Trafford. Again, Liverpool were top of the table on goal difference with United having two games in hand. The match was slow and had few shots on target from either side, although United ran out 2–0 winners, with both goals coming in the first half. Cristiano Ronaldo got United's first with a deflected free kick after City's Stephen Ireland had fouled Dimitar Berbatov 25 yards out. On the stroke of half-time, Carlos Tevez got United's second, hitting the post on the way, after Berbatov had brilliantly controlled Darren Fletcher's long ball before setting-up Tevez just outside the box. This was Tevez's first league goal of the season at Old Trafford. The second half was fairly forgettable, with few points of note. Robinho blazed well wide from a good position for City, while Tevez hit the post from a matter of inches late on. The only other talking point was the angry reaction of Ronaldo to being substituted with over half an hour to play. The result left United needing just four points from their last three games to win a third consecutive title.

United gained three of those points away to Wigan three days later, when Michael Carrick's left-footed shot found the back of the net in the eighty-sixth minute. Wigan had almost gone in front within 90 seconds of the start, when Antonio Valencia was clean through, but shot wide of the goal. United then missed two chances in a minute when both Carrick and Wayne Rooney could not get the ball on target. Hugo Rodallega opened the scoring for Wigan in the 28th minute when he hit a shot past Edwin van der Sar at the near post. By half time, United had not managed a single shot on target, despite heavily dominating the possession. Carlos Tevez was brought on for Anderson early in the second half and did not disappoint, scoring a goal with a back-heeled deflected shot from Michael Carrick just three minutes after coming on. Not satisfied with a draw, United continued to press and Carrick's late shot through traffic put the Red Devils within one point of sealing the Premier League title, being now six points clear of second-placed Liverpool with two games to go, although the Merseysiders had a better goal difference and both teams now having the same number of matches left.

On 16 May, United successfully defended their Premier League title for the second year running with a 0–0 draw at home to Arsenal. Arsenal took the game to United, although fighting only for pride as their league position was already secured, and if it were not for some good defending by United, they could have taken the lead. Wayne Rooney could have put United ahead, but his first-half header went wide of Łukasz Fabiański's post. The Reds had a well-worked Park Ji-sung goal disallowed for an incorrect offside later in the second half. Park had slotted the ball into an empty net after playing a one-two with Cristiano Ronaldo, but Ronaldo was judged to have been ahead of the last defender when Park played the ball through. When the final whistle blew, the United players, manager and backroom staff celebrated jubilantly, having been crowned champions of England for the 18th time.

United's final game of the Premier League season, played on 24 May, was away to Hull. The majority of the team was rested ahead of the Champions League final three days later. Darron Gibson's 20-yard shot was enough to give United a 1–0 win.

=== Matches ===
Date	Opponents	H / A	Result F–A	Scorers	Attendance	League position
17 August 2008	Newcastle United	H	1–1	Fletcher 24'	75,512	10th
25 August 2008	Portsmouth	A	1–0	Fletcher 32'	20,540	5th
13 September 2008	Liverpool	A	1–2	Tevez 3'	44,192	9th
21 September 2008	Chelsea	A	1–1	Park 18'	41,760	15th
27 September 2008	Bolton Wanderers	H	2–0	Ronaldo 60' (pen.), Rooney 77'	75,484	8th
4 October 2008	Blackburn Rovers	A	2–0	Brown 31', Rooney 64'	27,321	6th
18 October 2008	West Bromwich Albion	H	4–0	Rooney 56', Ronaldo 69', Berbatov 72', Nani 90'	75,451	4th
25 October 2008	Everton	A	1–1	Fletcher 22'	36,069	5th
29 October 2008	West Ham United	H	2–0	Ronaldo (2) 14', 30'	75,397	6th
1 November 2008	Hull City	H	4–3	Ronaldo (2) 3', 44', Carrick 29', Vidić 57'	75,398	3rd
8 November 2008	Arsenal	A	1–2	Rafael 90'	60,106	4th
15 November 2008	Stoke City	H	5–0	Ronaldo (2) 3', 89', Carrick 45+1', Berbatov 49', Welbeck 84'	75,369	3rd
22 November 2008	Aston Villa	A	0–0		42,585	3rd
30 November 2008	Manchester City	A	1–0	Rooney 42'	47,320	3rd
6 December 2008	Sunderland	H	1–0	Vidić 90+1'	75,400	3rd
13 December 2008	Tottenham Hotspur	A	0–0		35,882	3rd
26 December 2008	Stoke City	A	1–0	Tevez 83'	27,500	3rd
29 December 2008	Middlesbrough	H	1–0	Berbatov 69'	75,294	3rd
11 January 2009	Chelsea	H	3–0	Vidić 45', Rooney 63', Berbatov 86'	75,455	3rd
14 January 2009	Wigan Athletic	H	1–0	Rooney 1'	73,917	2nd
17 January 2009	Bolton Wanderers	A	1–0	Berbatov 90'	26,021	1st
27 January 2009	West Bromwich Albion	A	5–0	Berbatov 22', Tevez 44', Vidić 60', Ronaldo (2) 65', 73'	26,105	1st
31 January 2009	Everton	H	1–0	Ronaldo 44' (pen.)	75,399	1st
8 February 2009	West Ham United	A	1–0	Giggs 62'	34,958	1st
18 February 2009	Fulham	H	3–0	Scholes 12', Berbatov 29', Rooney 62'	75,437	1st
21 February 2009	Blackburn Rovers	H	2–1	Rooney 23', Ronaldo 60'	75,000	1st
4 March 2009	Newcastle United	A	2–1	Rooney 20', Berbatov 56'	51,636	1st
14 March 2009	Liverpool	H	1–4	Ronaldo 23' (pen.)	75,569	1st
21 March 2009	Fulham	A	0–2		25,652	1st
5 April 2009	Aston Villa	H	3–2	Ronaldo (2) 13', 81', Macheda 90+3'	75,409	1st
11 April 2009	Sunderland	A	2–1	Scholes 19', Macheda 75'	45,408	1st
22 April 2009	Portsmouth	H	2–0	Rooney 9', Carrick 82'	74,895	1st
25 April 2009	Tottenham Hotspur	H	5–2	Ronaldo (2) 56' (pen.), 68', Rooney (2) 67', 71', Berbatov 79'	75,458	1st
2 May 2009	Middlesbrough	A	2–0	Giggs 25', Park 51'	33,767	1st
10 May 2009	Manchester City	H	2–0	Ronaldo 17', Tevez 45'	75,464	1st
13 May 2009	Wigan Athletic	A	2–1	Tevez 61', Carrick 86'	21,286	1st
16 May 2009	Arsenal	H	0–0		75,468	1st
24 May 2009	Hull City	A	1–0	Gibson 24'	24,945	1st

=== Final league table ===
Pos	Team	Pld	W	D	L	GF	GA	GD	Pts	Qualification or relegation
1	Manchester United (C)	38	28	6	4	68	24	+44	90	Qualification for the Champions League group stage (Note: Since both finalists of the FA Cup (Chelsea and Everton) and the League Cup winners (Manchester United) qualified for the European competitions based on their league position, the sixth-placed team (Aston Villa) received a berth in the Europa League play-off round and the seventh-placed team (Fulham) received a berth in the Europa League third qualifying round.)
2	Liverpool	38	25	11	2	77	27	+50	86	Qualification for the Champions League group stage
3	Chelsea	38	25	8	5	68	24	+44	83	Qualification for the Champions League group stage
4	Arsenal	38	20	12	6	68	37	+31	72	Qualification for the Champions League play-off round
5	Everton	38	17	12	9	55	37	+18	63	Qualification for the Europa League play-off round

Source: Barclays Premier League
Rules for classification: 1) points; 2) goal difference; 3) number of goals scored.
(C) Champions

== FA Cup ==
Manchester United entered the FA Cup at the Third Round stage, and were paired with Southampton at the draw on 30 November 2008. The match was played at St Mary's Stadium on 4 January 2009. The draw for the Fourth Round was held immediately before the match, and United were given the prospect of a home draw against Tottenham Hotspur should they overcome Southampton. As it turned out, United ran out 3–0 winners, Danny Welbeck opening the scoring in the 20th minute of his FA Cup debut. Southampton then gave themselves little chance of getting back into the game when their 19-year-old striker Matthew Paterson was sent off eight minutes before half-time for a high challenge on Nemanja Vidić. Shortly after the interval, United were awarded a free kick, from which David McGoldrick was adjudged to have handled the ball in the wall. Match referee Mike Riley immediately awarded a penalty, which Nani converted to double United's lead. The Red Devils then continued to dominate the match, introducing Rodrigo Possebon, Darron Gibson and Wayne Rooney halfway through the half. The latter two then combined with nine minutes left, with Rooney cutting the ball back for Gibson to smash the ball into the back of the net.

The Fourth Round was played at Old Trafford on 24 January 2009. Due to United's defensive injury crisis, Alex Ferguson had to call young defenders Fabio, Richard Eckersley and James Chester into the first team squad for the match, with Fabio starting at left back. The ramshackle nature of the United defence showed as Tottenham took an early lead through a glancing header from Roman Pavlyuchenko. However, United soon took the initiative back as Carlos Tevez rattled the bar before forcing Spurs 'keeper Ben Alnwick into a reflex save, while Danny Welbeck was only denied by a last-ditch block from Chris Gunter after dancing past three defenders. The score was turned on its head shortly after the half-hour mark, when the home side hit a two-goal salvo in as many minutes. In the 35th minute, Michael Carrick pulled the ball back to Paul Scholes on the edge of the box from a corner, and the midfielder's shot was deflected off Tom Huddlestone past a flat-footed Ben Alnwick. Then, a minute later, Carrick was the provider for United's second goal as he played Berbatov through the middle and the Bulgarian fired past Alnwick from the edge of the area. Early in the second half, United lost Fabio to injury and he was replaced by fellow debutant Richard Eckersley. United continued to apply pressure to the Spurs defence, but there were no further goals and the Red Devils advanced to the Fifth Round of the competition.

The Fifth Round draw was held on 25 January 2009, and United were drawn against either Derby County or Nottingham Forest. The replay between Derby and Forest was played on 4 February, and ended with Derby winning 3–2 to set up a third cup clash between Derby and United in the space of two months. United dominated the match, which was played on 15 February, from the kick-off, as the Derby goal was peppered with shots from the outset. Their reward for their dominance came shortly before the half-hour; the ball was worked across the face of the penalty area to Nani, who cut back inside and curled a shot past Stephen Bywater for the opening goal. United doubled their lead shortly before half-time, when they were awarded a free kick within the shooting range of Cristiano Ronaldo; the United winger crashed the free kick into the defensive wall, and the ball ricocheted to Darron Gibson – who had broken from the wall – and the Irish international fired a low shot into the bottom corner of the net. The scoring continued after the break, Ronaldo heading home Ryan Giggs' right-sided corner kick three minutes into the second half. John O'Shea and Danny Welbeck were brought on for Patrice Evra and Park Ji-sung in the 55th minute. However, no sooner than the substitution had been made, Derby had pulled a goal back; Miles Addison headed home a Kris Commons cross after a quickly taken free kick by Robbie Savage. Despite a late resurgence from Derby, it was United who had the last word, as Danny Welbeck rounded off some neat interplay between Ryan Giggs and Darren Fletcher with a curling shot past Bywater to make the final score 4–1 to United.

Immediately after the match against Derby, the Sixth Round draw handed United an away tie with Swansea City or Fulham. The replay between Swansea and Fulham was played on 24 February, with Fulham coming back from a goal down to win 2–1 and set United up with a trip to Craven Cottage on 7 March. United ran out comfortable 4–0 winners in the Six Round Proper at Fulham. Two first-half goals from Carlos Tevez followed by second-half goals from Wayne Rooney and Park Ji-sung ensured that United qualified for a record twenty-sixth FA Cup semi-final appearance. United drew Everton in the semi-finals to be played at Wembley Stadium on 19 April.

United fell at the semi-final stage of the FA Cup for the first time under Alex Ferguson as they lost on penalties to Everton following a 0–0 draw. Ferguson came in for some criticism in the press following a team selection shorn of many first-team regulars – a situation he later blamed on the poor state of the Wembley pitch. After a fairly forgettable game, albeit one which United dominated without creating too many goalscoring opportunities, Dimitar Berbatov and Rio Ferdinand both had their penalties saved by former United goalkeeper, Tim Howard. Despite a penalty miss from Tim Cahill, Everton ran out 4–2 winners on penalties and United's quest for five trophies was at an end.

Date	Round	Opponents	H / A	Result F–A	Scorers	Attendance
4 January 2009	Round 3	Southampton	A	3–0	Welbeck 20', Nani 47' (pen.), Gibson 81'	31,901
24 January 2009	Round 4	Tottenham Hotspur	H	2–1	Scholes 35', Berbatov 36'	75,014
15 February 2009	Round 5	Derby County	A	4–1	Nani 29', Gibson 43', Ronaldo 48', Welbeck 81'	32,103
7 March 2009	Round 6	Fulham	A	4–0	Tevez (2) 20', 35', Rooney 50', Park 81'	24,662
19 April 2009	Semi-final	Everton	N	0–0 (a.e.t.) (2–4p)		88,141

== League Cup ==
The draw for the League Cup's Third Round paired Manchester United with Middlesbrough. The match was played at Old Trafford on 23 September 2008, and resulted in a 3–1 win for the home side, who gave debuts to three young players;Ben Amos, Danny Welbeck and Manucho. In his first start for the club since returning from injury, Cristiano Ronaldo opened the scoring in the 25th minute, heading home Ryan Giggs' corner. Adam Johnson equalised for Middlesbrough ten minutes into the second half, but in the 66th minute, Emanuel Pogatetz was sent off for a serious foul on Rodrigo Possebon, which left the Brazilian requiring lengthy treatment before being replaced by Darron Gibson. The disparity in the teams' numbers meant that another United goal was practically inevitable, and it came in the 79th minute via Ryan Giggs. The Welshman's goal lifted him into 10th in the club's all-time list of goalscorers. Because of Possebon's injury, a total of nine minutes of injury time were played, and, in the fifth of the nine, Nani added a third goal for United, securing their passage into the Fourth Round of the competition.

The Fourth Round draw paired United with Queens Park Rangers, with the match to be played at Old Trafford on 11 November 2008. Alex Ferguson rested many of his first choice players for the match, while Rodrigo Possebon also made his return to first team action following his injury in the previous round. United had the majority of the possession during the game, but misplaced passes from midfield let them down at the final hurdle on occasion. Park Ji-sung nearly scored the opening goal on the hour mark, but his 30-yard effort rattled the woodwork. It took until the 73rd minute for QPR to have their first attempt on goal, but it amounted to nothing and, minutes later, Danny Welbeck was brought down in the box by Peter Ramage. Carlos Tevez stepped up to take the penalty, sending goalkeeper Radek Černý the wrong way to open the scoring. QPR's Samuel Di Carmine had a goal correctly ruled out for offside in the closing stages and United managed to hang on and progress to the last eight of the competition.

The draw for the Fifth Round of the League Cup took place on 15 November 2008, and United were drawn at home to Blackburn Rovers, with the match to be played on 3 December 2008. As usual, Alex Ferguson rested many of his bigger names, opting for a mixture of youth and experience for the game. The match started on a fairly even keel, with Blackburn defender Stephen Warnock testing goalkeeper Ben Foster early on. The match soon swung back the other way, but it took until the 35th minute for United to get on the scoresheet; Ryan Giggs sent over a cross, and Carlos Tevez beat Aaron Mokoena to the ball to head home. Tevez then linked up with Nani for the Portuguese winger to blast the ball past Paul Robinson for United's second in the 40th minute. Blackburn pulled a goal back shortly after half-time through Benni McCarthy, only for Tevez to double his personal tally from the penalty spot after he had been brought down by André Ooijer in the box in the 50th minute. Tevez's hat-trick came in the 54th minute, as he rounded off a brilliant team goal, orchestrated by Ryan Giggs and Anderson. Blackburn attempted to make a proper game of it as the match entered its final ten minutes, pulling two goals back through Matt Derbyshire and another one from Benni McCarthy, but a fourth goal for Tevez sealed a 5–3 win for United in the fourth minute of injury time, as he lashed the ball past Paul Robinson from the edge of the penalty area and sent the Red Devils into the League Cup semi-finals.

The semi-final draw, held on 6 December 2008, paired United with Championship side Derby County. As Derby were drawn out of the hat first, they were awarded the opportunity to play the first leg at their Pride Park home. The first leg was played on 7 January 2009, and Alex Ferguson continued his policy of selecting weakened sides in the League Cup, playing Tomasz Kuszczak in goal, Darron Gibson on the right of midfield and Danny Welbeck up front with Carlos Tevez, while Cristiano Ronaldo and Wayne Rooney were on the bench. Despite there being a gulf of 35 league places between the two sides at the start of play, it was Derby who looked more up for the game having two shots blocked at short range in the opening stages, before Kris Commons opened the scoring on the half-hour with a venomous strike from 25 yards. Unhappy at being a goal down, Ferguson turned to his big guns, Rooney and Ronaldo, just after the hour mark, and the latter hit a free kick just past the post in the closing stages. Rob Hulse almost doubled his team's lead shortly before the final whistle, but he could only turn the ball over the bar as it came to him off Kuszczak.

The second leg was played at Old Trafford two weeks after the first on 20 January 2009. Ferguson kept faith with much of the same team that had lost the first leg, with the exceptions of Ben Foster coming in for Kuszczak in goal, Gary Neville stepping in for Nemanja Vidić at centre back and Ryan Giggs in place of Paul Scholes in midfield. The first chance of the game fell to Derby's Kris Commons, who drove the ball just wide from long range, but it was Nani who opened the scoring for United. The Portuguese winger picked up the ball just inside the Derby half, pressed on towards the penalty area and hit a dipping effort past Roy Carroll into the far side of the goal. A second goal came six minutes later, John O'Shea slotting home after being given plenty of time by a poorly-executed offside trap. The score reached 3–0 just after the half-hour mark, as Carlos Tevez nodded home from close range after Derby's defence failed to deal with a cross from Rafael. United looked to have taken their foot off the gas after the half-time break, and rarely threatened the Derby goal. They used up the third of their substitutions midway through the half, so they were unable to replace Jonny Evans when he picked up an injury later on; that injury subsequently looked to be a contributory factor when Evans felled Paul Green in the penalty area, allowing Giles Barnes to pull a goal back for the Rams from the spot. Substitute Cristiano Ronaldo restored the Red Devils' three-goal lead with a penalty of his own after Carroll had tripped Tevez in the final minute, but Barnes had the final say in the game, pulling off a spectacular free kick to make the final score 4–2 to United on the night, and 4–3 on aggregate. The result sent United through to the final, where they would meet Tottenham Hotspur at Wembley Stadium on 1 March 2009, after the London side beat Burnley 6–4 on aggregate.

=== Final ===
The final was played at Wembley Stadium on 1 March. United continued with the policy of playing a mixture of younger, more inexperienced players in the League Cup with older, more experienced ones. Wayne Rooney, who had been expected to play, was not in the squad, having been sidelined by a virus and Dimitar Berbatov was not selected to play against his former team. Edwin van der Sar, who had not played any part in the run up to the Final, was again rested and Ben Foster was selected in goal, ahead of Tomasz Kuszczak.

The game was played at a good tempo and both teams had several chances to score. United started better with both Darron Gibson and Rio Ferdinand going close to opening the scoring, before Spurs got back into the match, forcing Foster into the first real save of the game. Early in the second half, Danny Welbeck was replaced by Anderson and he helped United take control of the second half, Carlos Tevez just shooting wide after a mis-hit shot from Jonny Evans. However, Tottenham were not out of the game and Aaron Lennon brought another good save from Foster just a few minutes after Cristiano Ronaldo was harshly booked for diving in the penalty area. A shot, three minutes into stoppage time from Ronaldo then smashed off the inside of the post, but came out and the game ended 0–0.

Extra time was a more quiet affair with few really good chances, although Darren Bent brought yet another good save from Foster and Patrice Evra shot narrowly over with a couple of minutes to go. However, extra time also ended 0–0 and the game went to penalties – for only the second time in League Cup Final history.

United won the coin toss and selected the penalties to be taken at the end where their fans were situated, and also took the first penalty. Ryan Giggs scored the first – though only just – hitting in off the upright. Spurs' Jamie O'Hara saw his penalty saved by Foster. Carlos Tevez scored his penalty to give United a 2–0 lead, followed by a successful penalty from Vedran Ćorluka for Spurs. Cristiano Ronaldo then slotted his penalty home, past Heurelho Gomes before David Bentley sent his penalty wide of the goal. This left Anderson to score the winning penalty, which he duly did and United won their third League Cup Final. Ben Foster won the Man of the Match award – the first goalkeeper since Liverpool's Jerzy Dudek in 2003 to win the award.

Date	Round	Opponents	H / A	Result F–A	Scorers	Attendance
23 September 2008	Round 3	Middlesbrough	H	3–1	Ronaldo 25', Giggs 79', Nani 90+5'	53,729
11 November 2008	Round 4	Queens Park Rangers	H	1–0	Tevez 76' (pen.)	62,539
3 December 2008	Round 5	Blackburn Rovers	H	5–3	Tevez (4) 35', 50' (pen.), 54', 90+4', Nani 40'	53,997
7 January 2009	Semi-final; First leg	Derby County	A	0–1		30,194
20 January 2009	Semi-final; Second leg	Derby County	H	4–2	Nani 16', O'Shea 22', Tevez 34', Ronaldo 87' (pen.)	73,374
1 March 2009	Final	Tottenham Hotspur	N	0–0 (a.e.t.; 4–1p)		88,217

== UEFA Champions League ==
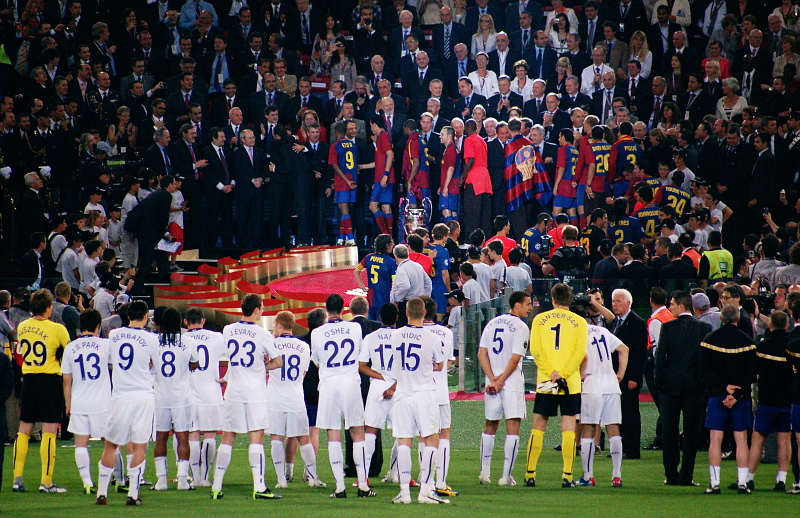
Manchester United finished as runners-up in the 2008–09 Champions League

=== Group stage ===
As the tournament's defending champions, Manchester United automatically qualified for the Champions League group stage as top seeds. This meant that they would avoid other heavyweights such as Real Madrid, Barcelona, and Inter Milan in the group stage. The draw was held on 28 August 2008 and United were drawn with two familiar sides, Villarreal (whom they had drawn in 2005–06) and Celtic (2006–07), and a new face in Danish side Aalborg BK.

Manchester United began their defence of the Champions League title at home to Villarreal, who set out their stall in a defensive manner, managing to hold the European champions to a third consecutive goalless draw between the two teams. Both teams put out weakened lineups, but it was to United that the first chance of the game fell. Owen Hargreaves' corner eluded everyone in the box, including the goalkeeper, but Rio Ferdinand could only scuff the ball across goal as he stabbed at it with his right foot. Carlos Tevez then had a 25-yard shot saved by Villarreal goalkeeper Diego López, while Park Ji-sung had two penalty claims turned down by German referee Wolfgang Stark. Twenty minutes into the second half, after Guillermo Franco had hit the inside of the post with a cheeky back-heel, Cristiano Ronaldo made his long-awaited return from injury to rapturous applause from the Old Trafford crowd. Ronaldo's arrival seemed to give the United team extra impetus, as within minutes he sent Wayne Rooney on a breakaway. The England international squared the ball to Carlos Tevez, but the Argentine was quickly closed down by Diego López and the chance was missed. The last two decent chances of the game fell to United; first to Ronaldo, who headed just wide from Nani's left-wing cross, and then to Jonny Evans, who headed against the foot of the post after Ronaldo crossed in from the right.

United got their first win of the Champions League season on 30 September 2008, when they visited Aalborg BK. The Red Devils were soon on the attack and Dimitar Berbatov could have got his name on the scoresheet after just six minutes, but he missed the target after Cristiano Ronaldo had charged down goalkeeper Karim Zaza's clearance. Paul Scholes was injured in the 15th minute and was replaced by Ryan Giggs, who immediately played in Wayne Rooney for the first goal of the game. The score remained at 1–0 until ten minutes after half-time, when Berbatov finally put the ball in the back of the net after pouncing on a mistake by Thomas Augustinussen. Tevez was brought on in the 59th minute after Rooney took a knock on his ankle, and introduced fresh attacking impetus to the United front line; he had a goal ruled out for unintentional use of the arm, before breaking into the box only for his square ball to Ronaldo to be wasted by the Portuguese international. Berbatov put the result beyond doubt in the 79th minute when he acrobatically volleyed Ronaldo's right wing cross into the goal.

A home win over fellow Britons Celtic followed on 21 October, all but securing United's progression to the knockout phase of the competition. Celtic were the first to threaten either goal, Aiden McGeady's 20-yard strike being stopped low by Edwin van der Sar after 11 minutes, but United went ahead on the half-hour via a contentious goal from Dimitar Berbatov. The Bulgarian had appeared to be in an offside position when John O'Shea prodded Nani's corner through to him, but it was not spotted by either the referee or his assistant. There were similar complaints about Berbatov's second goal six minutes after half-time, but again they went unheeded. Berbatov had been standing in an offside position when Ronaldo struck a long-range free kick, and after Artur Boruc was only able to palm it into the middle of the goal area, United's £30 million man was on hand to put it into the back of the net. United themselves were the next to question the linesman's decision after a seemingly legitimate Rooney goal was ruled out for offside, but Rooney had the ball in the net in the 76th minute to make it 3–0.

The return game against Celtic was played two weeks later on 5 November. The opening exchanges were played at great pace, with Ryan Giggs partnering Carlos Tevez up front, but it was Celtic who got the first goal, as Scott McDonald lobbed Ben Foster (who was making his Champions League debut) from 14 yards. United continued to press at the Celtic back line, but a combination of misplaced final balls and staunch defending by the Scots kept the Reds (who were playing in blue) off the scoresheet. Dimitar Berbatov and Wayne Rooney entered the game during the second half, but when United finally got their equaliser, it was neither the Bulgarian nor the Englishman who scored it. Cristiano Ronaldo hit a swerving shot from 25 yards, but it was too hot for goalkeeper Artur Boruc to handle and Ryan Giggs was on hand to head in from close range. Berbatov almost won the game for United in the final moments, but his shot on the turn went fractionally past the post and the match finished at 1–1. The result meant that United needed just a point from their final two matches to qualify for the knockout phase.

This required point was gained with another goalless draw away to Villarreal. United were the first to settle, Anderson testing Diego López in the Villarreal goal early on, before Wayne Rooney had the ball in the net in the eighth minute, only for his effort to be ruled out for offside. Shortly before half-time, an effort from Cristiano Ronaldo was tipped onto the crossbar by the fingertips of López, leaving the woodwork rattling. There were few chances in the second half, the major incident being the sending-off of Joan Capdevila for raising his studs when going into a challenge on Ronaldo. Nevertheless, a 0–0 draw – the fourth consecutive such result between these two teams – was enough to ensure that both qualified for the knockout phase. United remained top of the table on goal difference, needing only to better Villarreal's result on Matchday 6 to secure top spot in the group.

The final match in the group was played on 10 December 2008, with a depleted United side facing Aalborg at Old Trafford. Despite players being rested in preparation for the league game against Tottenham Hotspur the following Saturday, United wasted no time in getting on the scoresheet. After just two minutes, Giggs picked up the ball 25 yards from goal, before lobbing the ball over the defensive line with the outside of his left foot to find Carlos Tevez just onside. The Argentine then placed the ball past Aalborg's goalkeeper, Karim Zaza, with the outside of his right foot to score the quickest Champions League goal of the season to date. However, a few minutes later, Tevez missed a simpler chance to double both his and United's tally when he side-footed the ball the wrong side of the left-hand post. From that point on, it looked like United had dropped down a gear, a point that was emphasised when Aalborg not only equalised, but went ahead before half time. First, Michael Jakobsen beat Tomasz Kuszczak with a glancing header from Anders Due's 31st-minute free kick, and then Jeppe Curth directed a perfect header past the Polish goalkeeper, again from Due's delivery. Paul Scholes and Park Ji-sung replaced Ryan Giggs and Darron Gibson at half time, and United equalised seven minutes later, Wayne Rooney toe-poking the ball through Zaza's legs from just inside the penalty area. Rooney very nearly set up a goal for Gary Neville in the 69th minute, but his shot was blocked by Zaza, much to the United captain's disgust. United continued to make chances, but they were unable to find the net. Nevertheless, in conjunction with Celtic's 2–0 win over Villarreal, the result meant that United finished on top of Group E, and also extended the club's unbeaten run in the Champions League to 19 games, equalling the previous record, set by Bayern Munich and Ajax.

Date	Opponents	H / A	Result F–A	Scorers	Attendance	Group position
17 September 2008	Villarreal	H	0–0		74,944	1st
30 September 2008	Aalborg BK	A	3–0	Rooney 22', Berbatov (2) 55', 79'	10,346	1st
21 October 2008	Celtic	H	3–0	Berbatov (2) 30', 51', Rooney 76'	74,655	1st
5 November 2008	Celtic	A	1–1	Giggs 84'	58,903	1st
25 November 2008	Villarreal	A	0–0		22,529	1st
10 December 2008	Aalborg BK	H	2–2	Tevez 3', Rooney 52'	74,382	1st

Pos	Team	Pld	W	D	L	GF	GA	GD	Pts	Qualification
1	(England) Manchester United	6	2	4	0	9	3	+6	10	Advance to knockout phase
2	(Spain) Villarreal	6	2	3	1	9	7	+2	9	Advance to knockout phase
3	(Denmark) AaB	6	1	3	2	9	14	−5	6	Transfer to UEFA Cup
4	(Scotland) Celtic	6	1	2	3	4	7	−3	5	

Source: RSSSF

=== Knockout phase ===
The draw for the Champions League round of 16 was made in Nyon, Switzerland, on 19 December 2008. United, as group winners could have faced teams such as Real Madrid and Juventus, as both finished second in their respective groups, but were ultimately paired with Inter Milan, managed by former Chelsea manager José Mourinho.

The first leg of the tie was played on 24 February 2009, with the major talking point being the fitness of United defenders Jonny Evans and John O'Shea. The two were pronounced fit an hour before kick-off, but, despite defence being the hot topic before the game, it was the United attack that did most of the talking during the first half. Cristiano Ronaldo tested Inter goalkeeper Júlio César with a free kick before forcing the Brazilian into a save from a powerful header in the opening few minutes. United continued to press throughout the half, and Ryan Giggs nearly opened the scoring midway through, but he could only hit the ball straight at Júlio César after a sublime turn away from Nelson Rivas. Inter themselves went close shortly before half-time, but Adriano was unable to beat Edwin van der Sar after being played in by Zlatan Ibrahimović. Inter came out stronger in the second half, and looked much more of a threat through Esteban Cambiasso, but United continued to search for that elusive away goal to take back to Old Trafford, and almost got it through Park Ji-sung, whose outstretched legs just missed Ronaldo's low pass across the face of goal. Giggs then tricked his way through the Inter defence on the edge of the area, only to be denied by Iván Córdoba's lunging block, before Wayne Rooney – thrown on as an 83rd-minute substitute – was denied by the legs of Júlio César. Finally, in the dying seconds of the game, Ronaldo was felled by Córdoba on the edge of the area, well within his striking range; he stepped up to take the resulting free kick himself, but it was easily saved by Júlio César, and the match finished as a goalless draw.

The second leg was a tight affair at Old Trafford with United knowing conceding an away goal could prove costly and Inter knowing that a score-draw would be enough to send them through. Sir Alex Ferguson had won only 1 of the previous 13 meetings against sides managed by Inter manager, José Mourinho, a statistic that the media focused on heavily in the buildup to the game. However, United nerves were settled early as Nemanja Vidić headed in a Ryan Giggs corner after just four minutes. This led to a dominant period of play for United in terms of possession, although Inter had chances to score – Zlatan Ibrahimović heading against the crossbar and shooting wide from a tight angle. United also missed chances to go further ahead, John O'Shea shooting too close to Júlio César when put through. Nerves were playing a part as Inter grew into the game and it was the Italians who started strongly in the second half, only for Cristiano Ronaldo to head in from a Wayne Rooney centre, four minutes into the second half. Inter had chances to score in the second half, Adriano missing an excellent chance as he shot against the inside of the upright, and Ibrahimović heading wide from close range. United also missed chances to score a third with Giggs and Berbatov both going close, but the scoring had come to an end and United ran out 2–0 winners on the night and on aggregate. The draw for the quarter- and semi-finals took place on 20 March 2009 and paired United with Porto in the quarter-final, with the home leg first. United were also put in the same side of the draw as Arsenal and Villarreal, meaning they will play either of the teams should they beat Porto.

Beating Porto began to look problematic from as early as the fourth minute of the first leg at Old Trafford when Cristian Rodríguez scored for the visitors. This game was played just two days after a dramatic late win for United over Aston Villa in the league, which may have contributed to a lethargic performance from the home team. An awful back pass fifteen minutes into the match gave Wayne Rooney the chance to equalise for United, which he duly did, but the poor performance from United continued, with Porto putting United under regular pressure. Despite this, United created a number of chances throughout the game and finally took one on 85 minutes when a Rooney flick was buried by Carlos Tevez. This goal looked to have given United an important win but Mariano González scored in the 89th minute to give Porto two away goals and a 2–2 draw.

United started the game at the Estádio do Dragão in impressive fashion and scored an away goal of their own after just six minutes when a powerful strike from just short of 40 yards from Cristiano Ronaldo flew past goalkeeper Helton and into the top corner. United continued to press in the first 20 minutes and began to dominate the game, although Porto came back into the match as the first half progressed. Cristian Săpunaru forced a good save from Edwin van der Sar and Bruno Alves headed wide from a free kick before Nemanja Vidić missed a glorious chance just before half time, managing to shoot over from four yards out following a corner. The second half began well for both sides, with Dimitar Berbatov shooting at the keeper for United, while Raul Meireles shot over and Hulk saw his free-kick saved by van der Sar. Late on, Lisandro López saw his effort saved by Van der Sar and Ronaldo saw his low shot well saved by Helton, but there were to be no more goals for either side and United became the first English team to beat Porto in the Estádio do Dragão, winning the tie 3–2 on aggregate. Their semi-final against Arsenal meant that there was a guarantee of an English team in the Champions League Final for the fifth straight year.

Manchester United's semi-final first leg was at home to Arsenal. United started well, with Wayne Rooney forcing Arsenal goalkeeper Manuel Almunia into a save within the first two minutes. Further chances for Cristiano Ronaldo and Carlos Tevez followed, before John O'Shea scored after 17 minutes after a corner. United continued to dominate the first half-hour with Almunia again saving Arsenal from going further behind – the best chance being a close-range header from Ronaldo. United's performance in the second half was not as good. Arsenal passed the ball around well, keeping possession but failing to seriously penetrate United's defence. United hit on the break a number of times, Ronaldo hitting a shot from over 30 yards that cannoned off the crossbar, and substitute Ryan Giggs, making his 800th appearance for United (and his first since becoming PFA Player of the Year) had a goal ruled out for offside. The second goal never came and Arsenal had the last real chance, a header over the crossbar from Nicklas Bendtner. United held on to win 1–0, with the second leg at the Emirates Stadium six days later.

United were 3–0 up on aggregate after just 11 minutes at the Emirates, meaning that Arsenal needed four goals to make the final. It was the Gunners who started better and dominated the early possession, but with United's first attack, Cristiano Ronaldo put in a deep cross. Defender Kieran Gibbs slipped at the vital moment and Park Ji-sung slotted the ball into the net after just eight minutes. Three minutes later, a 40-yard free kick from Ronaldo beat Manuel Almunia to give United a 2–0 lead on the night. Needing a four-goal swing, Arsenal dominated possession but were unable to break United down. Just after the hour mark, a breakaway from United saw Ronaldo score his second and United's third less than 15 seconds after Arsenal had taken a corner at the other end. With 15 minutes to go, Darren Fletcher was sent-off by referee Roberto Rosetti for bringing down Cesc Fàbregas in the penalty area, despite replays showing that Fletcher made contact with the ball first. This red card meant that he would miss the final if United advanced. The resulting penalty was slotted home by Robin van Persie, but Arsenal – needing four more goals to make the final – could not find momentum from the goal and the match ended 3–1, with a 4–1 aggregate win for United, who became the first team since Juventus in 1997 to reach the Champions League final the season after winning the tournament, and the first team to reach consecutive finals since Valencia in 2001.

On 27 May, United lost to Barcelona 2–0 in the final following goals from Samuel Eto'o after 10 minutes (the Spanish side's first attempt on goal) and Lionel Messi 20 minutes from time. United performed poorly throughout, with the exception of the first 10 minutes and Sir Alex Ferguson admitted after the game that Barcelona had been the better side in the final.

Date	Round	Opponents	H / A	Result F–A	Scorers	Attendance
24 February 2009	Round of 16; First leg	Internazionale	A	0–0		80,018
11 March 2009	Round of 16; Second leg	Internazionale	H	2–0	Vidić 4', Ronaldo 49'	74,769
7 April 2009	Quarter-final; First leg	Porto	H	2–2	Rooney 15', Tevez 85'	74,517
15 April 2009	Quarter-final; Second leg	Porto	A	1–0	Ronaldo 6'	50,010
29 April 2009	Semi-final; First leg	Arsenal	H	1–0	O'Shea 17'	74,733
5 May 2009	Semi-final; Second leg	Arsenal	A	3–1	Park 8', Ronaldo (2) 11', 61'	59,867
27 May 2009	Final	Barcelona	N	0–2		62,467

== Club World Cup ==
As winners of the 2007–08 UEFA Champions League, Manchester United earned the right to compete in the FIFA Club World Cup, alongside the champions from each of FIFA's five other continental confederations. The way the competition is organised meant that United were entered at the semi-final stage, where they would play either Japan's Gamba Osaka or the winner of a play-off between Adelaide United of Australia and Waitakere United of New Zealand. Adelaide United beat Waitakere United in the play-off, but lost to Gamba Osaka in the quarter-finals, meaning that Manchester United would face Gamba Osaka at the International Stadium of Yokohama on 18 December 2008.

Bulgarian striker Dimitar Berbatov was ruled out of the semi-final match with a viral infection the day before the game, but Sir Alex Ferguson was able to name his veteran trio of Ryan Giggs, Paul Scholes and Gary Neville in the starting XI. The match started fairly evenly; although United had most of the ball, Gamba Osaka were able to counter-attack quickly. The first goal did end up going United's way, however, as Giggs picked out Nemanja Vidić from a corner kick for the Serbian to head into the back of the net. United then went 2–0 up on the stroke of half-time, Giggs delivering another right-sided corner, this time for Cristiano Ronaldo to nod in. Darren Fletcher and Wayne Rooney were introduced in place of Paul Scholes and Carlos Tevez halfway through the second half. However, Gamba pulled a goal back almost immediately in the 74th minute, only for Rooney to restore United's two-goal lead a minute later. Fletcher then made it 4–1 in the 78th, before Rooney doubled his personal tally in the 79th. Five minutes from full-time, though, Gary Neville handled the ball inside the box and the referee awarded Gamba a penalty kick, which Yasuhito Endō converted. Finally, in the first minute of injury time at the end of the game, Hideo Hashimoto scored another consolation goal to make the score 5–3. The result meant that United were through to the final of the competition, in which they would face LDU Quito of Ecuador on 21 December 2008.

Like the semi-final, the final was played at the International Stadium in Yokohama. Dimitar Berbatov was unable to fully recover from his virus, but was named on the bench for United, while Wayne Rooney was rewarded for his semi-final brace with a place in the starting line-up, meaning that the trio of Rooney, Ronaldo and Tevez all started the match. Meanwhile, captain Gary Neville was left out in place of Rafael, meaning that Rio Ferdinand captained the side. The match started very much in United's favour, but they were unable to convert their dominance into goals, LDU goalkeeper José Francisco Cevallos keeping the Reds' strikers at bay. Shortly after the break, Vidić was involved in an altercation with LDU midfielder Claudio Bieler; Bieler first committed a foul on Vidić, but while the two were grounded, Vidić lashed out at Bieler with an elbow. The Argentine rolled across the turf clutching his face, to which the Uzbek referee, Ravshan Irmatov, responded with a straight red card. In order to restore numbers in defence, Alex Ferguson withdrew Carlos Tevez and introduced Jonny Evans. The numerical advantage gave LDU extra confidence, and they looked like they might be the ones to open the scoring. However, with 17 minutes to go, Cristiano Ronaldo picked the ball up on the edge of the penalty area and laid it off to Wayne Rooney on the left side of the box, who then placed the ball past Cevallos into the far corner of the net. LDU came close to an equaliser in the final minute, Damián Manso hitting a long-range shot that forced Edwin van der Sar into a save at full-stretch. Despite LDU's late rally, United held on for a 1–0 win and their first Club World Cup title.

Date	Round	Opponents	H / A	Result F–A	Scorers	Attendance
18 December 2008	Semi-final	Gamba Osaka	N	5–3	Vidić 28', Ronaldo 45+1', Rooney (2) 75', 79', Fletcher 78'	67,618
21 December 2008	Final	LDU Quito	N	1–0	Rooney 73'	68,682

== Squad statistics ==
No.	Pos.	Name	League		FA Cup		League Cup		Europe		Other		Total		Discipline	
No.	Pos.	Name	Apps	Goals	Apps	Goals	Apps	Goals	Apps	Goals	Apps	Goals	Apps	Goals	Yellow card	Red card
1	GK	(Netherlands) Edwin van der Sar	33	0	2	0	0	0	10	0	4	0	49	0	1	0
2	DF	(England) Gary Neville (c)	13(3)	0	2	0	3	0	3(1)	0	3(1)	0	24(5)	0	3	0
3	DF	(France) Patrice Evra	28	0	2(1)	0	1(1)	0	10(1)	0	4	0	45(3)	0	7	0
4	MF	(England) Owen Hargreaves	1(1)	0	0	0	0	0	1	0	0	0	2(1)	0	0	0
5	DF	(England) Rio Ferdinand	24	0	3	0	1	0	11	0	4	0	43	0	3	0
6	DF	(England) Wes Brown	6(2)	1	0	0	1	0	0(2)	0	0(2)	0	7(6)	1	3	0
7	MF	(Portugal) Cristiano Ronaldo	31(2)	18	2	1	2(2)	2	11(1)	4	2	1	48(5)	26	9	1
8	MF	(Brazil) Anderson	11(6)	0	3	0	5(1)	0	7(2)	0	3	0	29(9)	0	1	0
9	FW	(France) Louis Saha	0	0	0	0	0	0	0	0	0	0	0	0	0	0
9	FW	(Bulgaria) Dimitar Berbatov	29(2)	9	2(1)	1	0	0	5(4)	4	0	0	36(7)	14	2	0
10	FW	(England) Wayne Rooney	25(5)	12	1(1)	1	0(1)	0	11(2)	4	2(1)	3	39(10)	20	9	1
11	MF	(Wales) Ryan Giggs (vc)	15(13)	2	2	0	3(1)	1	6(5)	1	2	0	28(19)	4	0	0
12	GK	(England) Ben Foster	2	0	3	0	3	0	1	0	0	0	9	0	0	0
13	MF	(South Korea) Park Ji-sung	21(4)	2	3	1	1	0	5(4)	1	1(1)	0	31(9)	4	5	0
14	MF	(Serbia) Zoran Tošić	0(2)	0	0(1)	0	0	0	0	0	0	0	0(3)	0	0	0
15	DF	(Serbia) Nemanja Vidić	33(1)	4	4	0	2(2)	0	9	1	4	2	52(3)	7	10	3
16	MF	(England) Michael Carrick	24(4)	4	3	0	0(1)	0	9	0	1(1)	0	37(6)	4	3	0
17	MF	(Portugal) Nani	7(6)	1	2	2	6	3	6(1)	0	3	0	24(7)	6	2	0
18	MF	(England) Paul Scholes	14(7)	2	1(1)	1	2(1)	0	3(3)	0	3	0	23(12)	3	6	2
19	FW	(England) Danny Welbeck	1(2)	1	3(2)	2	4(1)	0	0	0	0	0	8(5)	3	0	0
20	DF	(Brazil) Fabio	0	0	2	0	0	0	0	0	0	0	2	0	0	0
21	DF	(Brazil) Rafael	12(4)	1	2	0	5	0	2(2)	0	1	0	22(6)	1	5	0
22	DF	(Republic of Ireland) John O'Shea	20(10)	0	3(1)	0	6	1	12	1	1(1)	0	42(12)	2	3	0
23	DF	(Northern Ireland) Jonny Evans	16(1)	0	2(1)	0	5	0	6(1)	0	0(2)	0	29(5)	0	4	0
24	MF	(Scotland) Darren Fletcher	25(1)	3	2(1)	0	0(1)	0	8	0	2(2)	1	37(5)	4	6	1
25	DF	(England) Danny Simpson	0	0	0	0	0	0	0	0	0	0	0	0	0	0
26	FW	(Angola) Manucho	0(1)	0	0	0	0(2)	0	0	0	0	0	0(3)	0	0	0
27	DF	(France) Mikaël Silvestre	0	0	0	0	0	0	0	0	0	0	0	0	0	0
28	MF	(Republic of Ireland) Darron Gibson	1(2)	1	2(1)	2	5(1)	0	1(1)	0	0	0	9(5)	3	1	0
29	GK	(Poland) Tomasz Kuszczak	3(1)	0	0	0	2	0	2	0	0	0	7(1)	0	0	0
30	MF	(England) Lee Martin	1	0	0	0	0	0	0	0	0	0	1	0	0	0
31	FW	(England) Fraizer Campbell	1	0	0	0	0	0	0	0	0(1)	0	1(1)	0	1	0
32	FW	(Argentina) Carlos Tevez	18(11)	5	3	2	5(1)	6	4(5)	2	4	0	34(17)	15	7	0
33	MF	(England) Sam Hewson	0	0	0	0	0	0	0	0	0	0	0	0	0	0
34	MF	(Brazil) Rodrigo Possebon	0(3)	0	0(2)	0	3	0	0	0	0	0	3(5)	0	0	0
35	MF	(England) Tom Cleverley	0	0	0	0	0	0	0	0	0	0	0	0	0	0
36	DF	(Scotland) David Gray	0	0	0	0	0	0	0	0	0	0	0	0	0	0
37	DF	(Northern Ireland) Craig Cathcart	0	0	0	0	0	0	0	0	0	0	0	0	0	0
38	GK	(Germany) Ron-Robert Zieler	0	0	0	0	0	0	0	0	0	0	0	0	0	0
39	DF	(England) James Chester	0	0	0	0	0(1)	0	0	0	0	0	0(1)	0	0	0
40	GK	(England) Ben Amos	0	0	0	0	1	0	0	0	0	0	1	0	0	0
41	FW	(Italy) Federico Macheda	2(2)	2	1	0	0	0	0	0	0	0	3(2)	2	2	0
42	DF	(England) Richard Eckersley	0(2)	0	0(2)	0	0	0	0	0	0	0	0(4)	0	0	0
43	MF	(Italy) Davide Petrucci	0	0	0	0	0	0	0	0	0	0	0	0	0	0
44	DF	(Belgium) Ritchie De Laet	1	0	0	0	0	0	0	0	0	0	1	0	0	0
45	MF	(Northern Ireland) Corry Evans	0	0	0	0	0	0	0	0	0	0	0	0	0	0
46	MF	(England) Danny Drinkwater	0	0	0	0	0	0	0	0	0	0	0	0	0	0
47	MF	(England) Matty James	0	0	0	0	0	0	0	0	0	0	0	0	0	0

== Transfers ==
United's first departure of the 2008–09 season was Chris Eagles, who signed for Burnley for an undisclosed fee on 29 July. On 20 August, Mikaël Silvestre departed for Arsenal (also for an undisclosed fee). Eight days later, United released Dong Fangzhuo, and on the same day that Dong departed (28 August), Louis Saha signed for Everton for an undisclosed fee.

United's three summer arrivals were Brazilian twins Rafael and Fabio, who joined from Brazilian club Fluminense for an undisclosed fee, and striker Dimitar Berbatov, who became the first Bulgarian to sign for Manchester United when he arrived from Tottenham Hotspur on the last day of the summer transfer window.

United's other two arrivals came during the winter transfer window. Zoran Tošić and Ritchie De Laet arrived respectively from Partizan and Stoke City in early January. United also struck a deal to sign Adem Ljajić from Partizan, with the youngster due to join in January 2010, but the transfer was cancelled in December 2009.

=== In ===
Date	Pos.	Name	From	Fee
1 July 2008	DF	(Brazil) Fabio	(Brazil) Fluminense	Undisclosed
1 July 2008	DF	(Brazil) Rafael	(Brazil) Fluminense	Undisclosed
1 September 2008	FW	(Bulgaria) Dimitar Berbatov	(England) Tottenham Hotspur	£30.75m
2 January 2009	MF	(Serbia) Zoran Tošić	(Serbia) Partizan	Undisclosed
8 January 2009	DF	(Belgium) Ritchie De Laet	(England) Stoke City	Undisclosed
30 June 2009	MF	(Ecuador) Antonio Valencia	(England) Wigan Athletic	Undisclosed

=== Out ===
Date	Pos.	Name	To	Fee
29 July 2008	MF	(England) Chris Eagles	(England) Burnley	Undisclosed
20 August 2008	DF	(France) Mikaël Silvestre	(England) Arsenal	Undisclosed
28 August 2008	FW	(China) Dong Fangzhuo	Released	
28 August 2008	FW	(France) Louis Saha	(England) Everton	Undisclosed

=== Loan out ===
Date From	Date To	Pos.	Name	Moving To
1 July 2008	30 June 2009	GK	(England) Tom Heaton	(Wales) Cardiff City
22 July 2008	17 January 2009	FW	(England) Febian Brandy	(Wales) Swansea City
4 August 2008	30 June 2009	DF	(England) Danny Simpson	(England) Blackburn Rovers
8 August 2008	30 June 2009	DF	(Northern Ireland) Craig Cathcart	(England) Plymouth Argyle
13 August 2008	31 December 2008	MF	(England) Lee Martin	(England) Nottingham Forest
1 September 2008	30 June 2009	FW	(England) Fraizer Campbell	(England) Tottenham Hotspur
27 November 2008	25 February 2009	GK	(Germany) Ron-Robert Zieler	(England) Northampton Town
1 January 2009	30 June 2009	DF	(Scotland) David Gray	(England) Plymouth Argyle
5 January 2009	5 April 2009	MF	(England) Sam Hewson	(England) Hereford United
16 January 2009	30 June 2009	FW	(Angola) Manucho	(England) Hull City
16 January 2009	30 June 2009	MF	(England) Tom Cleverley	(England) Leicester City
2 February 2009	2 March 2009	DF	(England) James Chester	(England) Peterborough United
2 February 2009	30 June 2009	FW	(England) Febian Brandy	(England) Hereford United
