= Fraizer Campbell =

English footballer (born 1987)

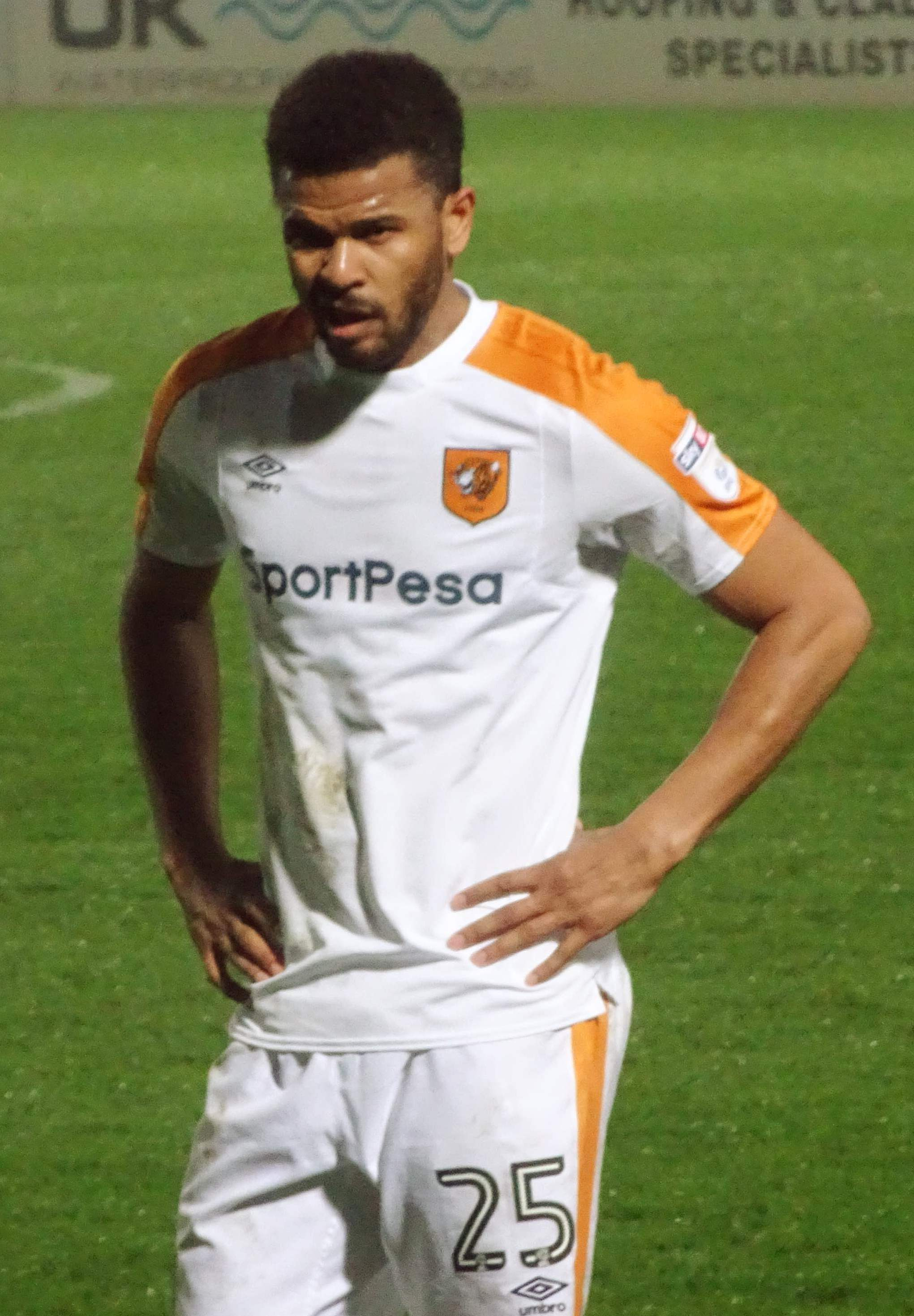
- Campbell playing for Hull City in 2018

Personal information
- Full name: Fraizer Lee Campbell
- Date of birth: 13 September 1987 (age 39)
- Place of birth: Huddersfield, England United Kingdom
- Height: 5 ft 8 in (1.72 m)
- Position: Striker

Youth career
- 1997–2006: Manchester United
- Stile Common

Senior career*
Years	Team	Apps	(Gls)
2006–2009	Manchester United	2	(0)
2006–2007	→ Royal Antwerp (loan)	31	(20)
2007–2008	→ Hull City (loan)	34	(15)
2008–2009	→ Tottenham Hotspur (loan)	10	(1)
2009–2013	Sunderland	58	(6)
2013–2014	Cardiff City	49	(13)
2014–2017	Crystal Palace	43	(5)
2017–2019	Hull City	75	(18)
2019–2022	Huddersfield Town	92	(10)
Total		394	(88)

International career
2003	England U16	3	(0)
2004	England U17	6	(0)
2004	England U18	1	(0)
2008–2009	England U21	14	(4)
2012	England	1	(0)
- * Club domestic league appearances and goals

Fraizer Lee Campbell (born 13 September 1987) is a former English professional footballer who played as striker for major professional clubs. He had a career performing for top professional teams such as Manchester United, Royal Antwerp, Hull City, Tottenham Hotspur, Sunderland, Cardiff City, and Crystal Palace.

A product of Manchester United's youth academy, Campbell progressed to their first team in the 2006–07 season. He made four appearances without scoring in his tenure at the club. He had a loan spell at Belgian club Royal Antwerp, where he scored 24 goals in 38 appearances. He also had loan periods with Hull City and Tottenham Hotspur, where he scored 15 goals in 37 matches and three goals in 22 appearances respectively. He signed for Sunderland at the beginning of the 2009–10 season for £3.5 million. His involvement at Sunderland was limited due to an anterior cruciate ligament injury he sustained in his second season at the club, as well as a recurrence of the same problem later in the season. He moved to Cardiff in January 2013 on a three-and-a-half-year deal, and then Crystal Palace 18 months later. After resigning to Hull City for two-years, he transferred to Huddersfield Town.

Having previously represented England from under-16 to under-21 level, Campbell earned his sole cap to date for the senior team in 2012.

== Early life ==
Born in Huddersfield, West Yorkshire, Campbell grew up in a Manchester United-supporting household and studied at Huddersfield Grammar School. As a child, Campbell had a short spell at Huddersfield Town's Centre of Excellence, but he was scouted by Manchester United at the age of 10. He also played for Stile Common.

== Career ==
=== Manchester United ===
==== Youth career ====
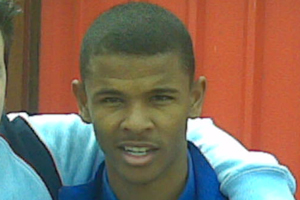
Campbell with Manchester United reserves in 2007

Having been in their youth schemes since the age of 10, Campbell signed for the Manchester United Academy on 1 July 2004. Campbell's signing provided an immediate impact by scoring 14 goals in 22 starts for the Under-18s in the 2004–05 season. His performances for the youth team also led to him playing five times for the reserves, for whom he scored once. He signed his first professional contract with Manchester United on 22 March 2006, and he was named as a substitute for Roy Keane's testimonial match at Old Trafford on 9 May 2006, in which he was a 75th minute replacement for Kieran Richardson. Later that summer, he scored his first goal for the club after coming on as a substitute for Wayne Rooney in a friendly against Macclesfield Town.

==== Royal Antwerp (loan) ====
Campbell joined Manchester United's Belgian partner club Royal Antwerp for the duration of the 2006–07 season, where his goal-scoring exploits resulted in the fans giving him the nickname "Super Campbell". His 21 goals in 31 starts propelled Antwerp to a higher place in the Belgian Second Division play-offs which changed their ranking and trajectory for the following season.

After returning to Manchester United from his loan deal, Campbell scored a volley against Glentoran on 8 August 2007 in a pre-season friendly. He made his senior debut for United on 19 August 2007 in the Manchester derby, after coming on in the 73rd minute for Michael Carrick.

==== Hull City (loan) ====
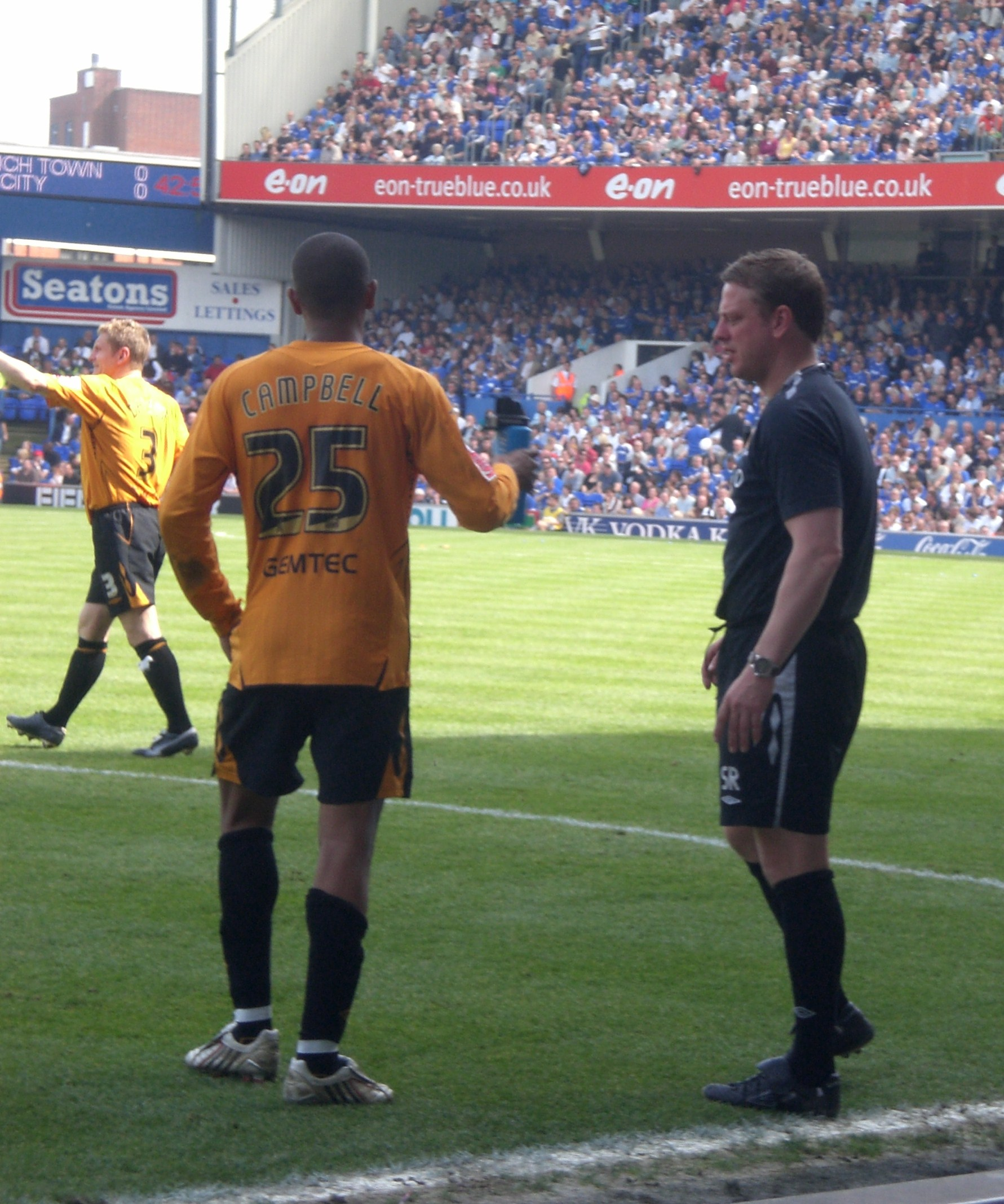
Campbell (left) playing for Hull City in 2008

Campbell was sent out on loan again in the 2007–08 season, this time at Hull City in the Championship. He initially joined Hull in October 2007 on loan until January 2008, and scored twice on his home debut in a 3–0 victory over Barnsley. Following his match-winning display against Wolverhampton Wanderers on Boxing Day 2007, in which he scored one goal and assisted another, Hull expressed their interest in extending Campbell's loan until the end of the season. The loan extension was completed on 28 December 2007.

Campbell finished the season as Hull's top scorer, with 15 goals in 32 appearances. On 24 May 2008, he played in the Hull City team that achieved promotion to the top flight for the first time in their 104-year history. Campbell provided the assist for Dean Windass' goal in a 1–0 win over Bristol City in the Championship play-off final at Wembley Stadium.

Hull expressed a strong desire to retain Campbell's services for the 2008–09 season, with Hull chairman, Paul Duffen, describing Campbell as "too good for the Championship". Following his successes leading to their promotion, Hull were hoping to secure either a permanent move or another season-long loan, depending on Manchester United's willingness to let him go. However, Campbell repeatedly expressed the desire to return to Old Trafford and try to break into the first team, saying "Now I'm back at United, the plan is to try to force my way into the first team." He added, "I'm going to continue to work hard and try to do enough to stay here and go on from there."

==== Return to Manchester United ====
In July 2008, Campbell was selected for the pre-season tour of South Africa with the Manchester United first team, and scored the team's fourth goal in a 4–0 win over Kaizer Chiefs in the final of the 2008 Vodacom Challenge. He also scored the winning goal in Ole Gunnar Solskjær's testimonial match against Espanyol on 2 August 2008. After the match, United manager Alex Ferguson indicated that Campbell would remain at the club for the duration of the season, stating "Fraizer's future is here". Campbell earned his first winner's medal when he entered the game as a substitute during Manchester United's penalty shoot-out win over Portsmouth during the gam for the 2008 FA Community Shield. On 17 August 2008, Campbell started on the field alongside Wayne Rooney for the opening match of the season in a 1–1 draw against Newcastle United.

=== Tottenham Hotspur ===
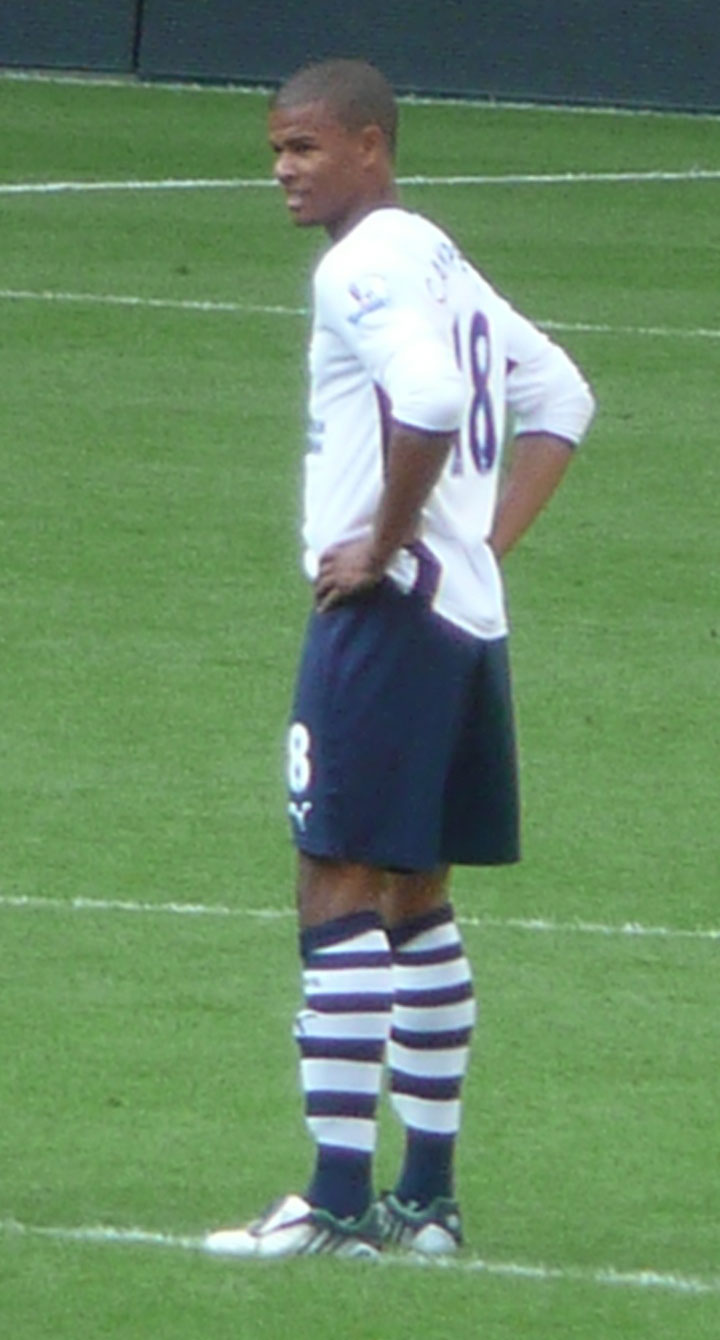
Campbell playing for Tottenham Hotspur in 2008

On 1 September 2008, transfer deadline day, Hull City bid a club record fee of £7 million for Campbell. However, he instead signed for Tottenham Hotspur on a season-long loan, as part of the transfer of Dimitar Berbatov to Manchester United for £30.75 million. This was contradictory to Ferguson's earlier claim that Campbell would be staying at United for the season. He explained the deal saying; "Tottenham insisted that he be part of the deal and Fraizer's signed his own agreement to go there for the year so we're happy with that." He made his Tottenham debut on 18 September 2008, coming on as a 56th-minute substitute for Aaron Lennon in a UEFA Cup first-round first-leg match against Wisła Kraków. Within 15 minutes of coming on, Campbell provided Darren Bent with the assist for the winning goal. Campbell scored his first two goals for Tottenham in a 4–2 victory over Liverpool in the League Cup fourth round, as well as setting up his strike partner Roman Pavlyuchenko for the match's opening goal. On 15 November 2008, Campbell scored his first ever Premier League goal late in a 2–1 defeat to Fulham.

Hull City refused to give up on Campbell and in June 2009 they returned with a £6 million bid for Campbell, which was accepted by Manchester United. However, the striker said he would not decide on his future until completion of England's participation in the 2009 UEFA European Under-21 Championship.

=== Sunderland ===
In June 2009, Manchester United accepted a bid reported as £6 million from Hull City and on 1 July Campbell was reported to have chosen the club over Sunderland. On 11 July 2009, however, he signed a four-year contract with Sunderland after Manchester United had accepted a £3.5 million bid (potentially rising to £6 million) after successfully passing a medical earlier that same day. He scored his first goal for the club in a 2–0 League Cup victory over Birmingham City. On 28 December 2009, Campbell partnered Darren Bent in attack against Blackburn Rovers at Ewood Park in the 2–2 draw. Campbell scored twice in the FA Cup against non-League team Barrow on 2 January 2010. On 9 March 2010, Campbell scored his first Premier League goal for Sunderland, scoring against Bolton after just 41 seconds in a 4–0 win. The striker also scored in league matches against Aston Villa, Burnley and Birmingham.

Campbell began the 2010–11 season in goalscoring form in pre-season, scoring four goals in a friendly against Hull, and goals against Leicester City and Brighton & Hove Albion. Having forced his way into manager Steve Bruce's plans, he started the opening match of the new Premier League season, playing the full 90 minutes against Birmingham at the Stadium of Light in a 2–2 draw. He also played the full 90 minutes in Sunderland's next league outing against West Bromwich Albion at the Hawthorns. However, he sustained an anterior cruciate ligament injury in Sunderland's 1–0 win against Manchester City on 29 August 2010, which sidelined him for an expected six months. Steve Bruce said "It's a tragedy. But Fraizer will be back. He's a larger-than-life character. He was just starting to show what he was about. But make no mistake he'll be back and he'll be firing again." regarding the injury.

Campbell made his return to training in March 2011. Despite having seemingly recovered from the injury, Campbell suffered a recurrence of the ligament injury in the same knee in preparation for a match against Manchester City on 3 April 2011. After undergoing surgery on 20 April 2011, it was learned that Campbell would be out of action for 12 months. This injury ruled Campbell out of action for the remainder of the 2010–11 season and much of the 2011–12 season. Though he was proposed to return in March 2012, Steve Bruce revealed that Campbell was in the frame to return to action around Christmas time – three months ahead of schedule.

Campbell immediately scored during his debut return for Sunderland on 29 January 2012, coming on at half time for Connor Wickham against Middlesbrough in an FA Cup 4th Round tie where he scored the equaliser in a 1–1 draw at the Stadium of Light. Campbell made his Premier League return on 1 February 2012 against Norwich City, opening the scoring and providing an assist in a 3–0 home win.

=== Cardiff City ===
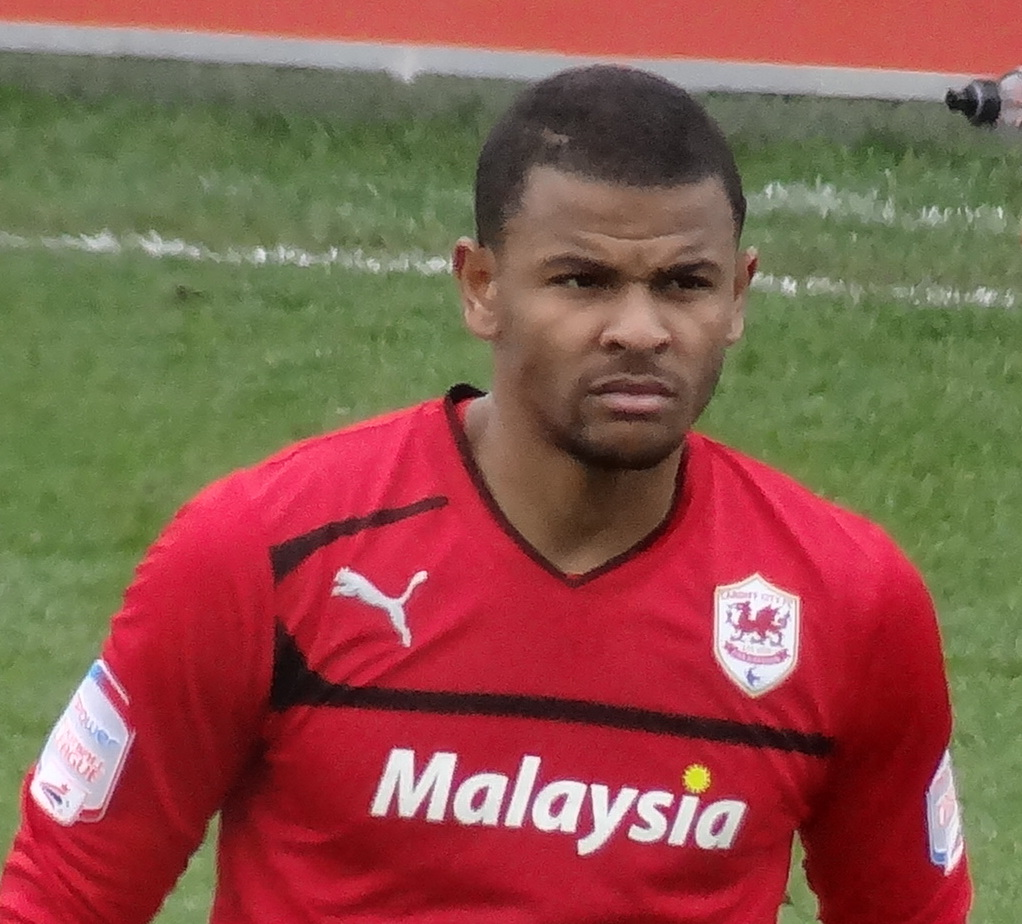
Campbell playing for Cardiff City in 2013

On 21 January 2013, Campbell signed for Cardiff City on a three-and-a-half-year deal for a fee believed to be in the region of £650,000. He made his debut on 2 February 2013 against Leeds United, where he scored the only goal of the match in the 64th minute after coming on as a substitute just two minutes before. On 16 February, Campbell scored two goals on his home debut against Bristol City in the Severnside derby, which was then followed by another two against Wolverhampton Wanderers the following week. Campbell was named as the Championship's Player of the Month for February 2013 after scoring all of Cardiff's five goals during the month. On the last day of the Championship title-winning season, Campbell scored in a 2–2 draw with his former club Hull, taking his final season tally for the Cardiff to seven goals in twelve appearances. In the second match of the 2013–14 season on 25 August 2013, Campbell scored twice in a famous 3–2 victory at Cardiff against Manchester City, with both goals coming from headers off corner kicks.

=== Crystal Palace ===
Cardiff accepted two bids for Campbell, one from Leicester City and one from Crystal Palace. On 24 July 2014, Crystal Palace completed the signing of Campbell on a three-year deal after matching the release clause in his contract, believed to be in the region of £900,000. He was released from his contract on 30 June 2017.

=== Return to Hull City ===
On 19 July 2017, Campbell re-signed for newly relegated Championship club Hull City on a two-year contract. He made his debut on the opening day of the season, 5 August 2017, away at Aston Villa, in a 1–1 draw. He scored his first goal for the club on 23 September 2017, in an away match against Reading that was drawn 1–1. He left Hull at the end of the 2018–19 season when his contract expired.

=== Huddersfield Town ===
Campbell signed for newly relegated Championship club Huddersfield Town on 12 August 2019 on a two-year contract. He made his debut on 21 August as an 84th-minute substitute in a 2–1 defeat away to Cardiff City, his former club. In the 2020–21 season, Campbell featured in 40 out of 46 Championship fixtures, scoring seven goals. He was awarded the Championship Goal of the Month award for September and was nominated for the EFL's Mitre Goal of the Year competition. He is an ambassador for the club's charity, the Huddersfield Town Foundation. On 11 May 2021, he signed a new one-year deal with Huddersfield, with the option of a further year. Huddersfield announced on 1 June 2022 that Campbell had not been offered a new contract and would be released when his current contract expired at the end of the month.

=== As a free agent ===
Campbell commented in January 2023 that he was not officially retired yet, but "in my mind I thought I'd play another year this season and then call it quits. But the way it's worked out, I was getting offers abroad or down south, and I couldn't really be bothered moving my family around just for the sake of a year somewhere. I was hoping to maybe continue this season but nothing's come about, so I'm just enjoying [doing media work] and spending more time with my kids. I'll see what comes up."

== International career ==
Campbell was capped at various youth levels for England, playing three times for the under-16s, six times for the under-17s and once for the under-18s.

During his loan spell at Hull City, Campbell received his first call-up to the England under-21 team, coming on as a substitute in a match against Poland on 25 March 2008. He scored his first international goal on 18 November 2008 in a 2–0 victory over the Czech Republic Under-21s. He also scored in the second group match of the 2009 UEFA European Under-21 Championship against Spain, in a 2–0 victory on 18 June 2009. He was sent off in the semi-final of the championship against Sweden. Following his under-21 experience, Campbell's Sunderland manager Steve Bruce urged Fabio Capello to consider Campbell for promotion to the senior squad saying, "the England manager should have a look at him", also saying "As for England, why not? Why not go with up-and-coming young talent?"

On 23 February 2012, despite only scoring six league goals in four years, Campbell received his first call-up to the England squad for the friendly versus the Netherlands. Interim England manager Stuart Pearce had stated his ambitions to select untried young players for the friendly which would take place on 29 February. Pearce had given Campbell all 14 of his under-21 caps. Campbell made his debut as a substitute for Danny Welbeck in the 80th minute, as England lost 3–2 due to an injury-time game-winning goal by Arjen Robben.

== Personal life ==
Campbell is of Jamaican descent. He has two children with his wife, Emma. He missed the birth of his first child, as he was making his debut for England. Campbell's daughter was born at almost exactly the same time as he came on the pitch as a second-half substitute.

His younger brother Ashford was a contestant on show called, The X Factor 2011 as part of boy band called, The Risk until they were voted out in the episode of Week 5.

== Career statistics ==
=== Club ===
As of end of 2021–22 season

Appearances and goals by club, season and competition
Club	Season	League			National cup (Note: Includes FA Cup and Belgian Cup)		League cup		Continental		Other		Total	
Club	Season	Division	Apps	Goals	Apps	Goals	Apps	Goals	Apps	Goals	Apps	Goals	Apps	Goals
Manchester United	2006–07	Premier League	0	0	0	0	0	0	0	0	—		0	0
Manchester United	2007–08	Premier League	1	0	0	0	1	0	0	0	0	0	2	0
Manchester United	2008–09	Premier League	1	0	0	0	0	0	0	0	1 (Note: Appearance(s) in FA Community Shield)	0	2	0
Manchester United	Total		2	0	0	0	1	0	0	0	1	0	4	0
Royal Antwerp (loan)	2006–07	Belgian Second Division	31	20	5	3	—		—		2 (Note: Appearance(s) in Belgian Second Division play-offs)	1	38	24
Hull City (loan)	2007–08	Championship	34	15	0	0	—		—		3 (Note: Appearance(s) in Championship play-offs)	0	37	15
Tottenham Hotspur (loan)	2008–09	Premier League	10	1	1	0	4	2	7 (Note: Appearance(s) in UEFA Cup)	0	—		22	3
Sunderland	2009–10	Premier League	31	4	2	2	3	1	—		—		36	7
Sunderland	2010–11	Premier League	3	0	0	0	1	0	—		—		4	0
Sunderland	2011–12	Premier League	12	1	5	1	0	0	—		—		17	2
Sunderland	2012–13	Premier League	12	1	1	0	1	0	—		—		14	1
Sunderland	Total		58	6	8	3	5	1	—		—		71	10
Cardiff City	2012–13	Championship	12	7	—		—		—		—		12	7
Cardiff City	2013–14	Premier League	37	6	3	3	0	0	—		—		40	9
Cardiff City	Total		49	13	3	3	0	0	—		—		52	16
Crystal Palace	2014–15	Premier League	20	4	2	1	0	0	—		—		22	5
Crystal Palace	2015–16	Premier League	11	0	3	1	1	1	—		—		15	2
Crystal Palace	2016–17	Premier League	12	1	1	0	0	0	—		—		13	1
Crystal Palace	Total		43	5	6	2	1	1	—		—		50	8
Hull City	2017–18	Championship	36	6	2	0	0	0	—		—		38	6
Hull City	2018–19	Championship	39	12	0	0	0	0	—		—		39	12
Hull City	Total		75	18	2	0	0	0	—		—		77	18
Huddersfield Town	2019–20	Championship	33	3	1	0	0	0	—		—		34	3
Huddersfield Town	2020–21	Championship	40	7	0	0	0	0	—		—		40	7
Huddersfield Town	2021–22	Championship	19	0	0	0	1	0	—		0	0	20	0
Huddersfield Town	Total		92	10	1	0	1	0	—		0	0	94	10
Career total			394	88	26	11	13	4	7	0	6	1	446	104

=== International ===
As of match played 29 February 2012

Appearances and goals by national team and year
National team	Year	Apps	Goals
England	2012	1	0
Total		1	0

== Honours ==
Hull City

- Football League Championship play-offs: 2008

Manchester United

- FA Community Shield: 2008

Cardiff City

- Football League Championship: 2012–13

Individual

- EFL Championship Goal of the Month: September 2020
