= Nemanja Vidić =

Serbian footballer (born 1981)

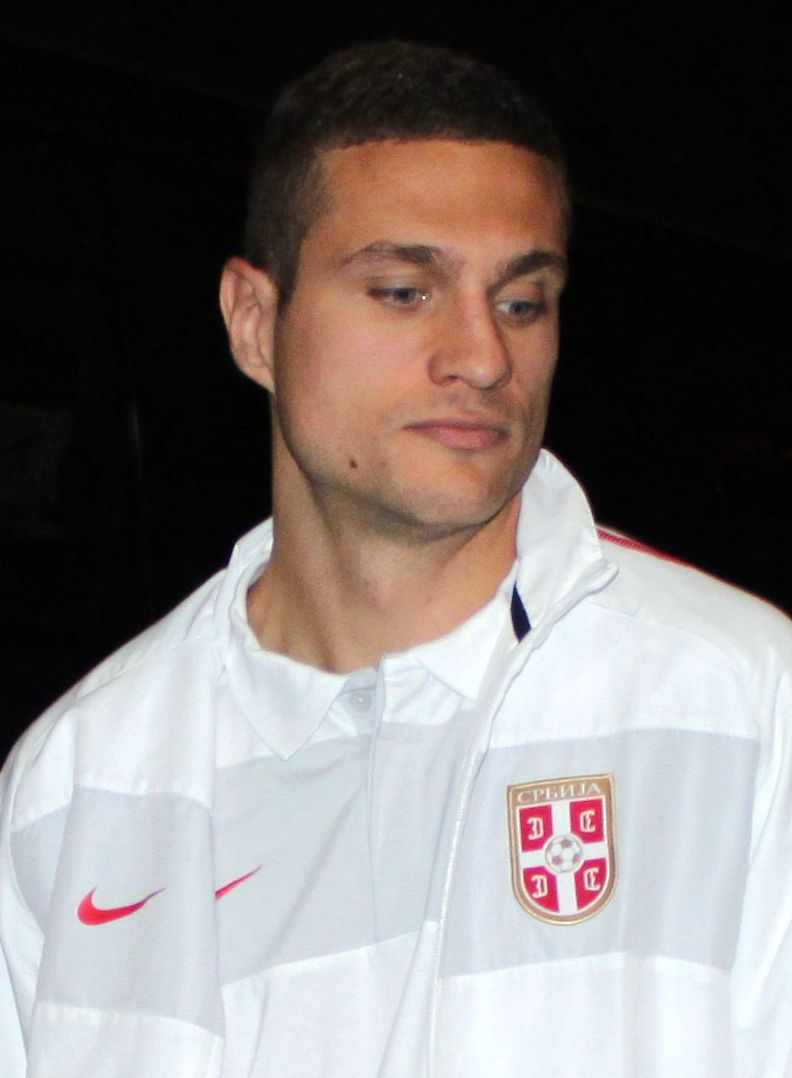
- Vidić with Serbia in 2010

Personal information
- Full name: Nemanja Vidić
- Date of birth: 21 October 1981 (age 45)
- Place of birth: Užice, SR Serbia, Yugoslavia
- Height: 1.90 m (6 ft 3 in)
- Position: Centre-back

Youth career
- 1989–1994: Jedinstvo Užice
- 1994–1996: Sloboda Užice
- 1996–2000: Red Star Belgrade

Senior career*
| Years | Team | Apps | (Gls) |
| 2000–2004 | Red Star Belgrade | 67 | (12) |
| 2000–2001 | → Spartak Subotica (loan) | 27 | (6) |
| 2004–2006 | Spartak Moscow | 39 | (4) |
| 2006–2014 | Manchester United | 211 | (15) |
| 2014–2016 | Inter Milan | 23 | (1) |
| Total | | 367 | (38) |

International career
| 2002–2011 | Serbia (Note: Including 20 caps and 1 goal for Serbia and Montenegro (known as FR Yugoslavia until 4 February 2003)) | 56 | (2) |
- * Club domestic league appearances and goals

Nemanja Vidić (Serbian Cyrillic: Немања Видић, Serbian pronunciation: [němaɲa ʋǐːditɕ]; born 21 October 1981) is a Serbian former professional footballer who played as a centre-back. Widely considered as one of the greatest defenders of all time, Vidić is best known for his time at Manchester United, where he won 15 trophies and served as club captain. He is one of only five players to win the Premier League Player of the Season award twice, alongside Thierry Henry, Kevin De Bruyne, Cristiano Ronaldo and Mohamed Salah. He is the only defender to have ever won the award twice.

After establishing himself at Red Star Belgrade during the early 2000s, Vidić moved to Spartak Moscow in the summer of 2004. He completed a £7 million transfer to Manchester United in January 2006, where he established a formidable defensive partnership with Rio Ferdinand. Vidić spent eight years at United, during which time he won five Premier League titles, three Football League Cups, five FA Community Shields, the FIFA Club World Cup and the UEFA Champions League. He was appointed club captain in 2010, a position he held for four years until his departure. In 2014, Vidić joined Serie A club Inter Milan on a free transfer. He mainly featured as a rotational player for two seasons before retiring in January 2016 due to injury problems.

A Yugoslavian youth international, Vidić made his senior debut on 12 October 2002 against Italy in UEFA Euro 2004 qualification. He was part of Serbia and Montenegro's "Famous Four" defence that conceded just one goal during the ten 2006 FIFA World Cup qualification matches, setting a record for the fewest goals conceded. Vidić retired from the Serbia national team in October 2011.

== Club career ==
=== Early years ===
Vidić was born to Dragoljub, a now-retired copper factory worker, and Zora, a bank clerk. Vidić took up football at six years of age, alongside his older brother Dušan, with local side Jedinstvo Užice. He progressed quickly, and moved to Sloboda Užice at the age of 12.

=== Red Star and Spartak Moscow ===
Two-and-a-half years after signing for Sloboda Užice, before his 15th birthday, Red Star Belgrade signed Vidić to their youth system. He started his senior career on a season-long loan deal at Spartak Subotica in 2000. He moved back to Red Star after the loan deal ended, playing regularly in the top-flight Yugoslav League with coach Zoran Filipović. He won the 2001–02 Yugoslav Cup with Red Star. Vidić quickly gained the captain's armband, and during his three years as captain, he scored 12 goals in 67 matches and ended his Red Star career on a high note by leading the club to a domestic double. He won the 2004 Serbia and Montenegro League and Serbia and Montenegro Cup trophies with Red Star and, in July 2004, he joined Russian Premier League side Spartak Moscow. The details of the transfer were not revealed, although it was reported that Vidić became the most expensive defender in the history of the Russian Premier League.

=== Manchester United ===
==== 2005–06 season ====
After playing two seasons for Spartak Moscow, Vidić signed for Manchester United for a fee of around £7 million on 25 December 2005 and joined the club on 5 January 2006 after his work permit was granted. This was two and a half years after Manchester United's reported interest in him began. On this occasion, United beat out stiff competition for Vidić's signature, as his transfer to Fiorentina in Italy had already been agreed with the club's sporting director, Pantaleo Corvino. Since Fiorentina had to wait in order to complete the signing, due to not having any free non-EU spots on its roster at the time, United stepped in and hijacked the transfer. He was assigned the number 15 shirt and on 25 January 2006, he made his debut for United as a substitute for Ruud van Nistelrooy in the dying minutes of a 2–1 win in the League Cup semi-final second leg against Blackburn Rovers. On 26 February 2006, Vidić won his first trophy with United, coming on in the 83rd minute for Wes Brown in the 2006 League Cup final win against Wigan Athletic. Vidić received a medal for his appearance in the final, but later gave it to team-mate Giuseppe Rossi in recognition of Rossi's contributions in the earlier rounds of the competition.

==== 2006–07 season ====
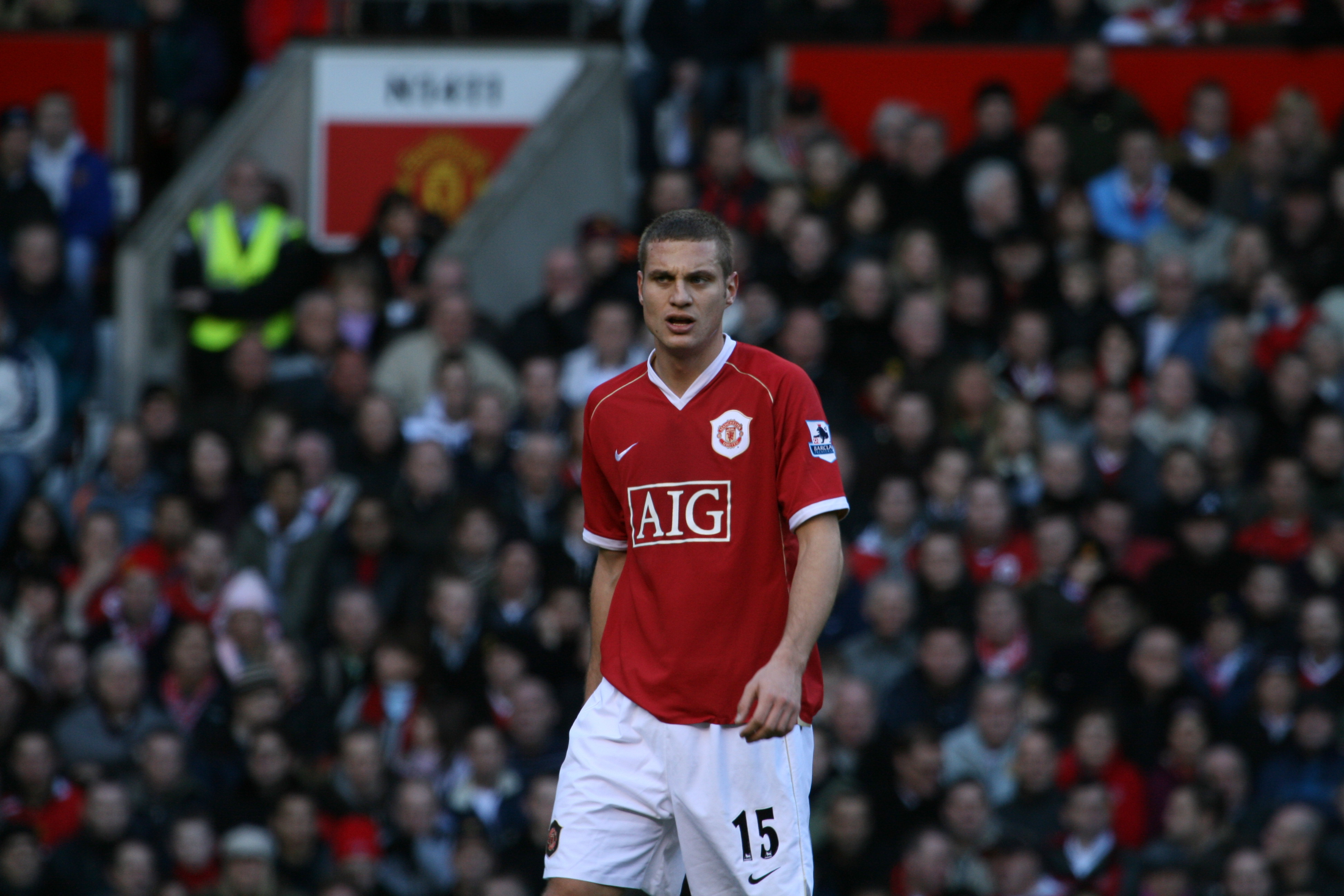
Vidić in 2006

During the 2006–07 Premier League season, Vidić formed a partnership with Rio Ferdinand in the centre of defence, which has since become one of the most prominent partnerships in European football, and became an established first team player, which he remained for the rest of his time at United. In his first full season playing for Manchester United, he made 25 appearances in the Premier League and ended the season winning his first league medal.

Vidić scored his first ever goal for United on 14 October 2006 against Wigan Athletic in the team's 1–3 victory. He scored his second goal in a 3–0 win over Portsmouth on 4 November, his first goal at Old Trafford. He scored his first Champions League goal for Manchester United against Benfica on 6 December in the group stage, a match which United won 3–1.

==== 2007–08 season ====
On 8 November 2007, Vidić signed a five-year contract extension, keeping him at Manchester United until 2012. At the end of the 2007–08 season, he earned his second consecutive Premier League medal. He was also a part of the squad which won the 2008 UEFA Champions League Final against Chelsea, his first European medal. During United's 2007–08 season, he made 32 league appearances and scored one goal.

==== 2008–09 season ====
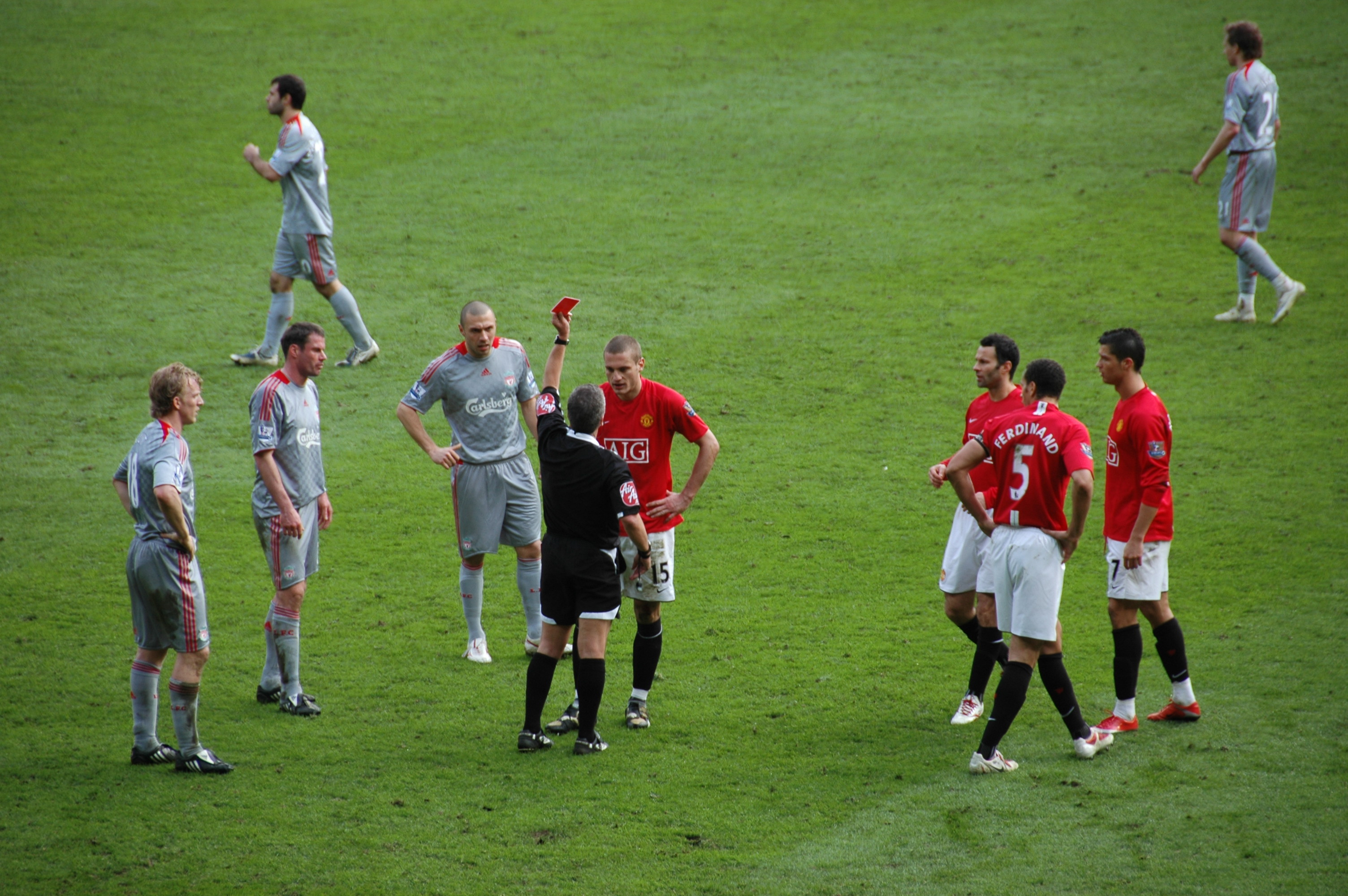
Vidić getting sent off in a Premier League match against Liverpool at Old Trafford on 14 March 2009

During the 2008–09 season, Vidić was a pivotal part of the United defence in the absence of a number of other defenders during various parts of the season. He started every match in the domestic league, with United going on a record run of 14 consecutive clean sheets in Premier League matches. Towards the end of the 2008–09 season, Vidić was shortlisted for the PFA Player of the Year award, along with four other United players; he was considered the favourite to receive the accolade, although it was later awarded to his team-mate Ryan Giggs. Vidić was later named as the Manchester United Fans' Player of the Year and Players' Player of the Year, succeeding Cristiano Ronaldo, who won both awards in 2007–08. Vidić won the Premier League Player of the Season for the first time. During the League Cup final, Vidić was deployed at right-back when he replaced John O'Shea.

==== 2009–10 season ====
On 25 October 2009, Vidić was again sent off against Liverpool in a 2–0 defeat, marking the third consecutive game against their fiercest rivals in which he had been shown a red card. On 21 March 2010, however, he managed to play a full 90 minutes in a 2–1 win against Liverpool at Old Trafford and again on 19 September 2010, this time in a 3–2 victory.

==== 2010–11 season ====
On 23 July 2010, it was reported that Vidić had extended his contract with Manchester United by agreeing to a new long-term contract, ending long-running speculation of a move to Real Madrid. The new four-year contract was signed on 20 August. Vidić scored his first goal of the season on 11 September away to Everton to put his side 1–2 up, the game ending with a dramatic finish, with the final score 3–3. After captaining Manchester United for the first five matches of the 2010–11 season, manager Alex Ferguson later confirmed that Vidić had taken over from Gary Neville as team and club captain on a permanent basis. On 30 October, Vidić scored his first home goal of the season in a 2–0 league win against Tottenham Hotspur, the 1,000th to be scored at Old Trafford in the Premier League. On 13 November 2010, Vidić scored his third goal of the season in a 2–2 away draw against Aston Villa in the 85th minute to grab United a point from a 2–0 deficit.

On 1 February, Vidić scored against Aston Villa at Old Trafford with a powerful drive inside the penalty area as United won 3–1. On 1 March 2011, Vidić was sent off in stoppage time in an intense match against Chelsea for a foul on Ramires. Chelsea won 2–1. Vidić got his revenge on 8 May, when he scored against Chelsea to end their title aspirations in a 2–1 victory, which also propelled United toward a record-breaking 19th Premier league title, a feat which was completed the following week at Blackburn Rovers. Vidić won the Premier League Player of the Season for his second and last time.

==== 2011–12 season ====
In August 2011, Vidić started the season opening game, the 2011 FA Community Shield at Wembley. He was taken off at half-time, however, along with partner Rio Ferdinand as United trailed 2–0 to Manchester City. In the second half, United turned the game around and won 3–2. Vidić went on to lift the shield as the captain, claiming his fourth Community Shield medal of his career. A week later, he started in Manchester United's opening Premier League fixture of the season at West Bromwich Albion, but was taken off during the second half with a calf injury. After the match, it was initially thought that Vidić would only miss a couple of weeks. A further diagnosis, however, found the injury to be worse than first feared, sidelining him for five weeks. He missed the wins against Tottenham Hotspur, Arsenal, Bolton Wanderers, Chelsea and the 1–1 draw against Stoke City. He also missed the first two UEFA Champions League games of the season against Benfica and Basel, both ending in draws.

After additionally missing the 2–0 home win against Norwich City on 1 October 2011, Alex Ferguson indicated that he hoped Vidić would be back for the match against Liverpool at Anfield on 15 October 2011. He did not make the match at Anfield, but returned in the following game in the Champions League against Oțelul Galați. United won the game 2–0. Vidić, however, was sent off midway through the second half for a high challenge in what was arguably a harsh decision. After the match, Ferguson said he could see why the referee gave the decision and that the club would not appeal, meaning Vidić had to serve a European suspension.

After missing the Manchester Derby the following weekend, which Manchester United heavily lost 6–1 to Manchester City, Vidić played his first full 90 minutes of the season against Aldershot Town in a fourth round League Cup tie, which United won 3–0. He made his return to Premier League action at Goodison Park in a 0–1 win against Everton. In the next four Premier League matches, he played a big part in winning and keeping clean sheets against Sunderland (1–0) at Old Trafford and Swansea City (0–1) at the Liberty Stadium. There was nothing to be done, however, for conceding a goal from a penalty kick caused by a controversial Rio Ferdinand tackle at home against Newcastle United in a 1–1 draw. Nevertheless, the skipper took his side to another clean sheet at Villa Park in a 0–1 win against Aston Villa with Phil Jones scoring the only goal. Alex Ferguson rested Vidić at Old Trafford in a shocking 2–1 League Cup quarter-final defeat against Crystal Palace.

On 7 December 2011, Vidić twisted his knee during United's Champions League clash at Basel and left the field on a stretcher. Ferguson later confirmed that he would miss the rest of the season.

==== 2012–13 season ====
Vidić returned to first-team action on 20 August 2012 in a 0–1 away defeat to Everton. On 25 August 2012, in a home game against Fulham, he scored an own goal in the 64th minute. A cross was played into the box from the left-hand side that goalkeeper David de Gea came for and tried to punch, resulting in the Spaniard becoming sandwiched between Vidić and Mladen Petrić; the ball came off his heel and bounced into the goal.

On 25 September 2012, Vidić was ruled out for eight weeks due to another knee injury. He was expected to return for United's game against CFR Cluj in the Champions League on 5 December 2012. He was ruled out of this game, however, and the next Premier League game against Manchester City. He eventually managed to make a return from injury, coming on as a 68th-minute substitute for Rio Ferdinand against Sunderland on 15 December. On 13 January 2013, he scored from a Patrice Evra header, which deflected over his head in a home game against Liverpool. Vidić managed to make 22 league appearances for the Red Devils, scoring one goal, as the club won its 13th Premier League title, finishing 11 points over incumbents Manchester City.

==== 2013–14 season ====
On 7 February 2014, Vidić announced that he would be leaving Manchester United at the end of the 2013–14 season when his contract expires. Vidić stated: "I'm not considering staying in England as the only club I ever wanted to play for here is Manchester United".

On 16 March, Vidić received his second yellow card and was subsequently sent off on 77 minutes in a 3–0 home defeat against Liverpool. Vidić's expulsion totaled to four red cards against Liverpool during his career at Manchester United, more than any other player against an opponent in the history of the Premier League.

On 1 April, Vidić scored the opening goal in Manchester United's 1–1 Champions League quarter-final first leg draw against Bayern Munich. United were eventually knocked out by a 4–2 aggregate scoreline.

He played his last home match for Manchester United on 6 May against Hull City, in which he received three standing ovations: one during a pre-match presentation for him by Bobby Charlton, the second when he came on as a substitute for Phil Jones, and the third for his first touch of the game.

=== Inter Milan and retirement ===
In 2014, Inter Milan announced that Vidić would be joining them at the end of his contract in July 2014. He made his debut for Inter on 30 July 2014, playing against his former team, Manchester United, in the International Champions Cup; he scored in the penalty shoot-out, but Inter lost the match. In his competitive debut, a goalless draw at Torino on 31 August, he conceded a penalty by fouling Fabio Quagliarella and was sent off for dissent after sarcastically applauding the referee in added time. On 18 September, Vidić was selected man of the match after his performance against Ukrainian side Dnipro Dnipropetrovsk where Inter won 1–0 in Kyiv thanks to a goal from Danilo D'Ambrosio. Three days later, in week three of 2014–15 Serie A, he made an error that allowed Franco Vázquez to score the only goal for Palermo in a 1–1 draw at Stadio Renzo Barbera.

Following Walter Mazzarri's departure as head coach, the returning Roberto Mancini relegated Vidić to the bench in favor of younger defenders Andrea Ranocchia and Juan Jesus. On 11 January 2015, he played his first game in two months in a 3–1 win over Genoa, where he scored his first goal for Inter with a header in the 88th minute. A string of injuries for Inter's defence, and good performances from Vidić, helped him to re-establish himself as a first team player.

On 18 January 2016, his contract with Inter Milan was ended by mutual consent. 11 days later, on 29 January, the defender announced his retirement from the game with immediate effect.

== International career ==
=== Serbia and Montenegro ===
A Yugoslav youth international, Vidić made his senior debut on 12 October 2002 against Italy in a UEFA Euro 2004 qualifying.

Vidić was part of Serbia and Montenegro's "Famous Four" defence, alongside Mladen Krstajić, Ivica Dragutinović and Goran Gavrančić, that conceded just one goal during the ten 2006 FIFA World Cup qualification matches, setting a new record for the fewest goals conceded. Vidić played a major part in the last qualification match, against Bosnia and Herzegovina, in which Serbia and Montenegro won 1–0 and secured qualification. However, Vidić was given a red card five minutes before the end. Vidić missed out on Serbia and Montenegro's opening group stage match against the Netherlands through suspension from his previous red card. On 12 June 2006, he injured his left knee ligament during training, thus did not participate in any games at the 2006 World Cup.

=== Serbia ===
After the World Cup, Vidić went on to represent the independent Serbia national team. He was a regular player during 2010 World Cup qualifying when fit, leading Serbia to finish top of their group behind France and Romania, with the best defensive record of all the teams participating in the group. Serbia had less luck at the 2010 FIFA World Cup, and came in last place in Group D. In a match against Germany in the Group Stage of the World Cup, Vidić gave away a penalty in the second half while Serbia were leading 1–0. However, Lukas Podolski's kick was successfully blocked by goalkeeper Vladimir Stojković.

On 11 October 2011, Vidić missed a decisive penalty against Slovenia. On 24 October 2011, he announced his retirement from the Serbia national team due to negative comments from fans about his performances in the national shirt.

== Style of play ==
Described by David Pleat of The Guardian as a "no-nonsense" defender, Vidić has been labelled as a "tough" centre-back, who was known for his physical challenges. He was considered to be one of the world's best centre-backs in his prime due to his defensive consistency and awareness, as well as his strength, leadership, and ability in the air, which made him a goal threat on set pieces. As such, he formed an effective and successful defensive partnership with a more mobile and technical defender such as Rio Ferdinand during their time together at Manchester United. Unlike Ferdinand, however, his playing style focussed primarily on the defensive aspect of the game, rather than attempting to carry the ball forward or play out from the back. He was also praised for his aggressive defensive style by his Manchester United team-mates, and was highly regarded in the media for his on-the-pitch bravery throughout his career. As a consequence, he enjoyed a cult status among the United faithful, and was often compared to former Manchester United defender Steve Bruce, who had similar characteristics. Although primarily a centre-back, Vidić was also capable of playing as a makeshift right-back on occasion, as was the case when he replaced O'Shea in the 2009 League Cup final. Although his preferred role was as part of a central defensive pairing in a back four, he was also capable of playing in a three-man defensive line on occasion. Pace being a major weakness, especially towards the end of his career, he compensated with his elite positioning and decision-making.

Commenting, upon the player's retirement, on Vidić's physical fearlessness, former Manchester United team mate Robin van Persie declared that "Nemanja puts his head where other players are scared to put their feet".

== Personal life ==
On 17 July 2005, Vidić married Ana Ivanović, an economics student at the University of Belgrade. They have three sons.

== Career statistics ==
=== Club ===
Appearances and goals by club, season and competition
| Club | Season | League | | | National Cup | | League Cup | | Europe | | Other (Note: Includes FA Community Shield, UEFA Super Cup, FIFA Club World Cup) | | Total | |
| Club | Season | Division | Apps | Goals | Apps | Goals | Apps | Goals | Apps | Goals | Apps | Goals | Apps | Goals |
|---|---|---|---|---|---|---|---|---|---|---|---|---|---|---|
| Red Star Belgrade | 2000–01 | First League of FR Yugoslavia | 0 | 0 | 0 | 0 | — | | 0 | 0 | — | | 0 | 0 |
| Red Star Belgrade | 2001–02 | First League of FR Yugoslavia | 22 | 2 | 5 | 0 | — | | 2 | 0 | — | | 29 | 2 |
| Red Star Belgrade | 2002–03 | First League of Serbia and Montenegro | 25 | 5 | 4 | 1 | — | | 6 | 0 | — | | 35 | 6 |
| Red Star Belgrade | 2003–04 | First League of Serbia and Montenegro | 20 | 5 | 5 | 0 | — | | 6 | 3 | — | | 31 | 8 |
| Red Star Belgrade | Total | | 67 | 12 | 14 | 1 | — | | 14 | 3 | — | | 95 | 16 |
| Spartak Subotica (loan) | 2000–01 | Second League of FR Yugoslavia | 27 | 6 | 0 | 0 | — | | — | | — | | 27 | 6 |
| Spartak Moscow | 2004 | Russian Premier League | 12 | 2 | 1 | 0 | — | | 0 | 0 | — | | 13 | 2 |
| Spartak Moscow | 2005 | Russian Premier League | 27 | 2 | 1 | 0 | — | | 0 | 0 | — | | 28 | 2 |
| Spartak Moscow | Total | | 39 | 4 | 2 | 0 | — | | 0 | 0 | — | | 41 | 4 |
| Manchester United | 2005–06 | Premier League | 11 | 0 | 2 | 0 | 2 | 0 | 0 | 0 | 0 | 0 | 15 | 0 |
| Manchester United | 2006–07 | Premier League | 25 | 3 | 5 | 0 | 0 | 0 | 8 | 1 | 0 | 0 | 38 | 4 |
| Manchester United | 2007–08 | Premier League | 32 | 1 | 3 | 0 | 0 | 0 | 9 | 0 | 1 | 0 | 45 | 1 |
| Manchester United | 2008–09 | Premier League | 34 | 4 | 4 | 0 | 4 | 0 | 9 | 1 | 4 | 2 | 55 | 7 |
| Manchester United | 2009–10 | Premier League | 24 | 1 | 0 | 0 | 2 | 0 | 7 | 0 | 0 | 0 | 33 | 1 |
| Manchester United | 2010–11 | Premier League | 35 | 5 | 2 | 0 | 0 | 0 | 9 | 0 | 1 | 0 | 47 | 5 |
| Manchester United | 2011–12 | Premier League | 6 | 0 | 0 | 0 | 1 | 0 | 2 | 0 | 1 | 0 | 10 | 0 |
| Manchester United | 2012–13 | Premier League | 19 | 1 | 2 | 0 | 0 | 0 | 2 | 0 | — | | 23 | 1 |
| Manchester United | 2013–14 | Premier League | 25 | 0 | 0 | 0 | 2 | 1 | 6 | 1 | 1 | 0 | 34 | 2 |
| Manchester United | Total | | 211 | 15 | 18 | 0 | 11 | 1 | 52 | 3 | 8 | 2 | 300 | 21 |
| Inter Milan | 2014–15 | Serie A | 23 | 1 | 0 | 0 | — | | 5 | 0 | — | | 28 | 1 |
| Inter Milan | 2015–16 | Serie A | 0 | 0 | 0 | 0 | — | | — | | — | | 0 | 0 |
| Inter Milan | Total | | 23 | 1 | 0 | 0 | — | | 5 | 0 | — | | 28 | 1 |
| Career total | | | 367 | 38 | 34 | 1 | 11 | 1 | 71 | 6 | 8 | 2 | 491 | 48 |

=== International ===
Appearances and goals by national team and year
| National team | Year | Apps | Goals |
|---|---|---|---|
| FR Yugoslavia | 2002 | 3 | 0 |
| Serbia and Montenegro | 2003 | 3 | 0 |
| Serbia and Montenegro | 2004 | 3 | 0 |
| Serbia and Montenegro | 2005 | 9 | 1 |
| Serbia and Montenegro | 2006 | 2 | 0 |
| Serbia | 2006 | 2 | 1 |
| Serbia | 2007 | 5 | 0 |
| Serbia | 2008 | 9 | 0 |
| Serbia | 2009 | 8 | 0 |
| Serbia | 2010 | 9 | 0 |
| Serbia | 2011 | 3 | 0 |
| Total | | 56 | 2 |

Scores and results list Serbia's goal tally first, score column indicates score after each Vidić goal.

List of international goals scored by Nemanja Vidić
| No. | Date | Venue | Cap | Opponent | Score | Result | Competition |
|---|---|---|---|---|---|---|---|
| 1 | 15 August 2005 | Valeriy Lobanovskyi Dynamo Stadium, Kyiv, Ukraine | 13 | Poland | 2–3 | 2–3 | Valeriy Lobanovskyi Memorial Tournament |
| 2 | 15 November 2006 | Red Star Stadium, Belgrade, Serbia | 22 | Norway | 1–0 | 1–1 | Friendly |

== Honours ==
Red Star Belgrade

- First League of Serbia and Montenegro: 2003–04
- FR Yugoslavia/Serbia and Montenegro Cup: 2001–02, 2003–04

Manchester United

- Premier League: 2006–07, 2007–08, 2008–09, 2010–11, 2012–13
- Football League Cup: 2005–06, 2008–09, 2009–10
- FA Community Shield: 2007, 2008, 2010, 2011, 2013
- UEFA Champions League: 2007–08; runner-up: 2008–09, 2010–11
- FIFA Club World Cup: 2008

Individual

- FIFA FIFPro World XI: 2009, 2011
- ESM Team of the Year: 2006–07, 2008–09, 2010–11
- PFA Team of the Year: 2006–07 Premier League, 2007–08 Premier League, 2008–09 Premier League, 2010–11 Premier League
- Premier League Player of the Season: 2008–09, 2010–11
- Premier League Player of the Month: January 2009
- Premier League 20 Seasons Awards (1992–93 to 2011–12)
  - Fantasy Teams of the 20 Seasons (Public choice)
- Sir Matt Busby Player of the Year: 2008–09
- Manchester United Players' Player of the Year: 2008–09
- Best Sportsman of SD Crvena Zvezda: 2002
- Serbian Footballer of the Year: 2005, 2008
- Serbia's Overseas Player of the Year: 2005, 2007, 2008, 2010
