= 2008 FA Community Shield =

- Match programme cover
- Event: FA Community Shield
Manchester United	Portsmouth
0	0
- Manchester United won 3–1 on penalties
- Date: 10 August 2008
- Venue: Wembley Stadium, London
- Man of the Match: Carlos Tevez
- Referee: Peter Walton
- Attendance: 84,808
- Weather: Rain; 20 °C (68 °F)

The 2008 FA Community Shield (also known as The FA Community Shield sponsored by McDonald's for sponsorship reasons) was the 86th staging of the FA Community Shield, an annual football match played between the reigning Premier League champions and FA Cup winners. The match was played on 10 August 2008 between 2007–08 Premier League champions Manchester United and 2007–08 FA Cup winners Portsmouth as the "curtain-raiser" to the 2008–09 English football season. The match marked the 100th year since the first Charity Shield, also won by Manchester United after a replay in August 1908.

Manchester United won the game 3–1 on penalties, after the match finished 0–0 after 90 minutes; the Community Shield no longer plays extra time if the teams are level at the end of normal time.

The match was the second meeting between the two teams in the space of two weeks, after they had played each other in a friendly in Nigeria on 27 July 2008. It was also the first Community Shield since 1996 to feature a team from outside the big four of Manchester United, Chelsea, Arsenal and Liverpool. With this Community Shield title, United extended their record number of wins in the competition to 13 (17 including shared titles).

== Match details ==
10 August 2008
15:00 BST

Manchester United	0–0	Portsmouth
	Report
Penalties
Tevez (penalty scored); Giggs (penalty scored); Carrick (penalty scored)	3–1	(penalty missed) Diarra; (penalty scored) Defoe; (penalty missed) Mvuemba; (penalty missed) Johnson

Wembley Stadium, London
Attendance: 84,808
Referee: Peter Walton (Northamptonshire)^{[A]}

Manchester United	Portsmouth

GK	1	(Netherlands) Edwin van der Sar
RB	2	(England) Gary Neville (c)	(yellow card) 61'	(substituted off) 66'
CB	5	(England) Rio Ferdinand
CB	15	(Serbia) Nemanja Vidić	(yellow card) 45'
LB	3	(France) Patrice Evra
RM	24	(Scotland) Darren Fletcher
CM	18	(England) Paul Scholes
CM	22	(Republic of Ireland) John O'Shea		(substituted off) 66'
LM	17	(Portugal) Nani		(substituted off) 79'
SS	11	(Wales) Ryan Giggs
CF	32	(Argentina) Carlos Tevez
Substitutes:
GK	29	(Poland) Tomasz Kuszczak
DF	6	(England) Wes Brown		(substituted on) 66'
DF	21	(Brazil) Rafael
DF	23	(Northern Ireland) Jonny Evans
MF	16	(England) Michael Carrick		(substituted on) 66'
MF	34	(Brazil) Rodrigo Possebon
FW	31	(England) Fraizer Campbell		(substituted on) 79'
Manager:
(Scotland) Sir Alex Ferguson

GK	1	(England) David James
RB	5	(England) Glen Johnson
CB	15	(France) Sylvain Distin	(yellow card) 37'
CB	23	(England) Sol Campbell (c)
LB	7	(Iceland) Hermann Hreiðarsson		(substituted off) 79'
RM	8	(Senegal) Papa Bouba Diop
CM	30	(Portugal) Pedro Mendes		(substituted off) 75'
CM	6	(France) Lassana Diarra
LM	19	(Croatia) Niko Kranjčar		(substituted off) 60'
CF	9	(England) Peter Crouch
CF	14	(England) Jermain Defoe
Substitutes:
GK	21	(England) Jamie Ashdown
DF	4	(Cameroon) Lauren		(substituted on) 79'
DF	20	(England) Martin Cranie
DF	32	(Mali) Djimi Traoré
MF	18	(France) Arnold Mvuemba		(substituted on) 75'
FW	17	(Nigeria) John Utaka		(substituted on) 60'
FW	26	(Israel) Ben Sahar
Manager:
(England) Harry Redknapp

Man of the match

- Carlos Tevez (Manchester United)

Match officials

- Assistant referees:
  - Dave Richardson (West Yorkshire)
  - Ian Gosling (Kent)
- Fourth official: Andre Marriner (Birmingham)

Match rules

- 90 minutes
- Penalty shoot-out if scores level
- Seven named substitutes, of which up to six may be used

== See also ==
- 2007–08 Premier League
- 2007–08 FA Cup

== Footnotes ==
A. Mark Clattenburg was originally appointed as the match referee, but he was suspended over allegations of debt and replaced by Peter Walton.

== Sources ==
- 2008 Final at Guardian
