= 2012–13 Sunderland A.F.C. season =

English football club season

Sunderland
2012–13 season
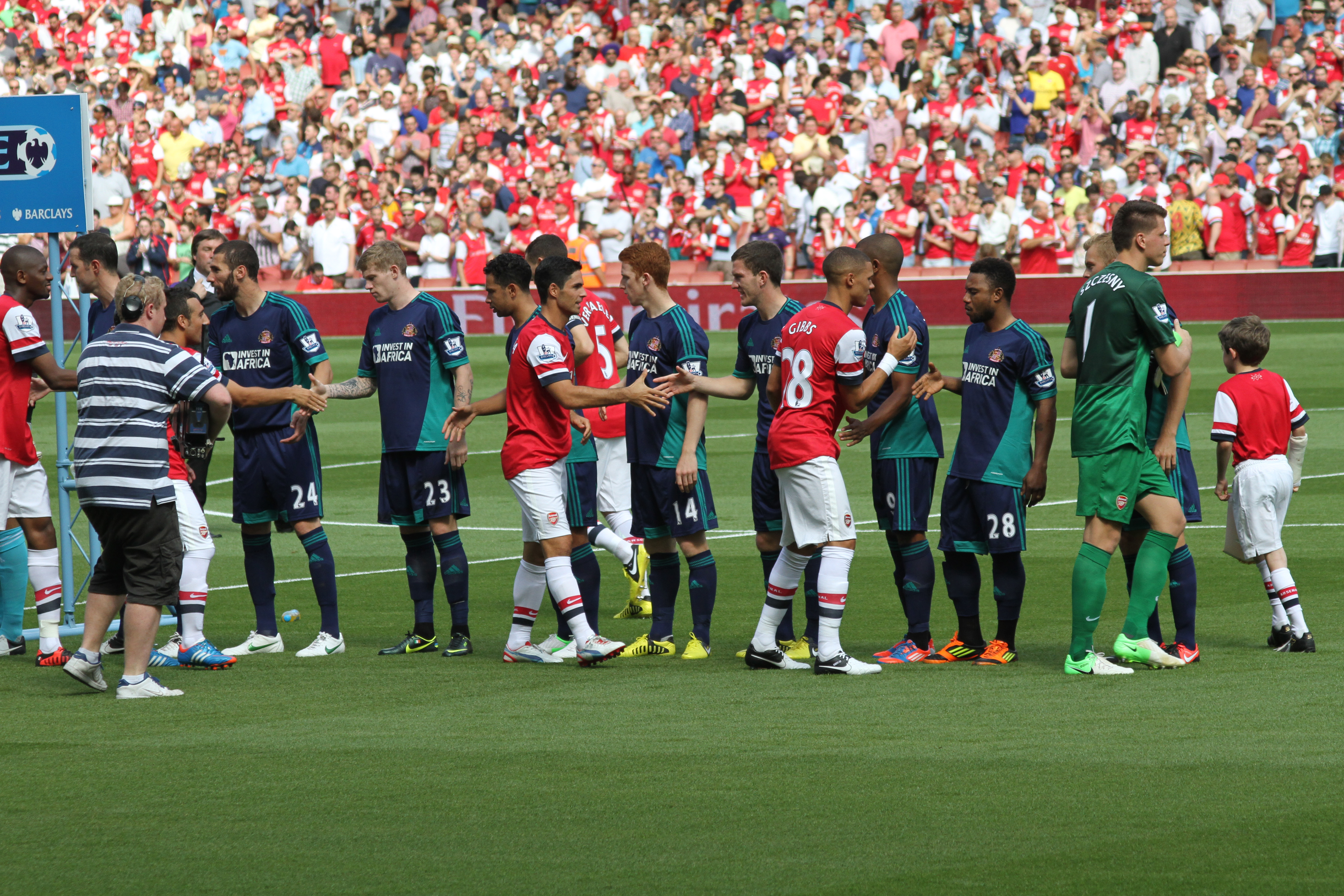
- Sunderland players before a match against Arsenal in August 2012
- Chairman: Ellis Short
- Manager: Martin O'Neill (until 30 March 2013); Paolo Di Canio (from 31 March 2013)
- Stadium: Stadium of Light
- Premier League: 17th
- FA Cup: Third round
- League Cup: Fourth round
- Top goalscorer: League: Steven Fletcher (11); All: Steven Fletcher (11)
- Highest home attendance: 47,456 (vs. Newcastle United)
- Lowest home attendance: 17,505 (vs. Bolton Wanderers)
- Average home league attendance: 40,544
Home colours	Away colours

The 2012–13 season was Sunderland's sixth consecutive season in the top division of English football, the Premier League. They finished the season in 17th place.

== Pre-season ==
=== Friendlies ===
Date	Opponents	H / A	Result H – A	Scorers
27 July 2012	Hartlepool United	A	1–0	–
4 August 2012	Helsingborg	A	2–0	–
8 August 2012	Derby County	A	1–1	McClean 71'
11 August 2012	Leicester City	A	1–0	–

=== 2012 Peace Cup ===
Sunderland, along with Eredivisie side Groningen, K-League side Seongnam, and Bundesliga side Hamburg, will compete in a friendly tournament, 2012 Peace Cup. All matches will be played at the Suwon World Cup Stadium in the Korean city of Suwon.

Date	Opponents	H / A	Result H – A	Scorers
19 July 2012	Seongnam Ilhwa Chunma	N	1–0	–
22 July 2012	Groningen	N	3–2	Wickham 19', Campbell 88', Noble 90'

== Premier League ==
Date	Opponents	H / A	Result H – A	Scorers	Attendance	League position
18 August 2012	Arsenal	A	0–0	–	60,078	11th
25 August 2012	Reading	H	P–P	–	–	13th
1 September 2012	Swansea City	A	2–2	Fletcher 40', 45'	20,350	13th
15 September 2012	Liverpool	H	1–1	Fletcher 29'	41,997	14th
22 September 2012	West Ham United	A	1–1	Fletcher 10'	33,052	12th
29 September 2012	Wigan Athletic	H	1–0	Fletcher 51'	37,742	11th
6 October 2012	Manchester City	A	0–3	–	47,036	13th
21 October 2012	Newcastle United	H	1–1	Ba 86' o.g.	47,456	14th
27 October 2012	Stoke City	A	0–0	–	27,005	14th
3 November 2012	Aston Villa	H	0–1	–	41,515	16th
10 November 2012	Everton	A	1–2	Johnson 45'	35,999	16th
18 November 2012	Fulham	A	3–1	Fletcher 50', Cuéllar 65', Sessègnon 70'	25,646	15th
24 November 2012	West Bromwich Albion	H	2–4	Gardner 73', Sessègnon 87'	36,390	16th
27 November 2012	Queens Park Rangers	H	0–0	–	36,513	16th
2 December 2012	Norwich City	A	1–2	Gardner 45'	26,228	17th
8 December 2012	Chelsea	H	1–3	Johnson 66'	39,273	18th
11 December 2012	Reading	H	3–0	McClean 3', Fletcher 28', Sessègnon 90'	37,723	15th
15 December 2012	Manchester United	A	1–3	Campbell 72'	75,582	16th
22 December 2012	Southampton	A	1–0	Fletcher 42'	31,275	15th
26 December 2012	Manchester City	H	1–0	Johnson 53'	42,190	13th
29 December 2012	Tottenham Hotspur	H	1–2	O'Shea 40'	41,168	13th
2 January 2013	Liverpool	A	0–3	–	44,228	14th
12 January 2013	West Ham United	H	3–0	Larsson 12', Johnson 48', McClean 74'	39,918	14th
19 January 2013	Wigan Athletic	A	3–2	Gardner 17' (pen), Fletcher 21', 42'	19,219	11th
29 January 2013	Swansea City	H	0–0	–	35,628	11th
2 February 2013	Reading	A	2–1	Gardner 28' (pen)	23,829	11th
9 February 2013	Arsenal	H	0–1	–	46,402	13th
23 February 2013	West Bromwich Albion	A	2–1	Sessègnon 79'	25,924	14th
2 March 2013	Fulham	H	2–2	Gardner 37' (pen), Sessègnon 70'	39,312	14th
9 March 2013	Queens Park Rangers	A	1–3	Fletcher 20'	18,169	15th
17 March 2013	Norwich City	H	1–1	Gardner (pen)40'	38,625	16th
30 March 2013	Manchester United	H	0–1	–	43,760	16th
7 April 2013	Chelsea	A	1–2	Azpilicueta og 45'	41,500	17th
14 April 2013	Newcastle United	A	0–3	Sessègnon 27', Johnson 74', Vaughan 82'	52,000	15th
20 April 2013	Everton	H	1–0	Sessègnon 45'	44,614	14th
29 April 2013	Aston Villa	A	6–1	Rose 32'	37,428	15th
6 May 2013	Stoke	H	1–1	O'Shea 62'	38,130	15th
12 May 2013	Southampton	H	1–1	Bardsley 68'	41,988	17th
19 May 2013	Tottenham Hotspur	A	1–0		36,258	17th

=== League table ===
Pos	Team	Pld	W	D	L	GF	GA	GD	Pts	Qualification or relegation
15	Aston Villa	38	10	11	17	47	69	−22	41	
16	Newcastle United	38	11	8	19	45	68	−23	41	
17	Sunderland	38	9	12	17	41	54	−13	39	
18	Wigan Athletic (R)	38	9	9	20	47	73	−26	36	Qualification for the Europa League group stage and relegation to Football League Championship (Note: Wigan Athletic qualified for the Europa League group stage as the 2012–13 FA Cup winners.)
19	Reading (R)	38	6	10	22	43	73	−30	28	Relegation to Football League Championship

Source: Barclays Premier League
Rules for classification: 1) Points; 2) Goal difference; 3) Goals scored; 4) Play-offs (only if needed to decide champion, teams for relegation or teams for UEFA competitions).
(R) Relegated

== League Cup ==
Date	Round	Opponents	H / A	Result H – A	Scorers	Attendance
28 August 2012	Second round	Morecambe	H	2–0	McClean 24', 65'	22,871
25 September 2012	Third round	Milton Keynes Dons	A	2–0	Gardner 54', McClean 82'	10,489
30 October 2012	Fourth round	Middlesbrough	H	0–1	–	32,535

== FA Cup ==
Date	Round	Opponents	H / A	Result H – A	Scorers	Attendance
5 January 2013	Third round	Bolton Wanderers	A	2–2	Wickham 60', Gardner 75'	12,204
15 January 2013	Replay	Bolton Wanderers	H	0–2	–	17,505

== Statistics ==
=== Appearances and goals ===
No.	Pos	Nat	Player	Total		Premier League		FA Cup		League Cup	
No.	Pos	Nat	Player	Apps	Goals	Apps	Goals	Apps	Goals	Apps	Goals
2	DF	(Scotland) SCO	Phil Bardsley	21	1	11+7	1	2	0	1	0
3	DF	(England) ENG	Danny Rose	29	1	25+2	1	1	0	1	0
4	MF	(France) FRA	Alfred N'Diaye	16	0	15+1	0	0	0	0	0
5	DF	(England) ENG	Wes Brown	0	0	0	0	0	0	0	0
6	MF	(England) ENG	Lee Cattermole	14	0	10	0	0+1	0	3	0
7	MF	(Sweden) SWE	Sebastian Larsson	41	1	36+2	1	1+1	0	1	0
8	MF	(England) ENG	Craig Gardner	37	8	32+1	6	2	1	2	1
9	FW	(England) ENG	Danny Graham	13	0	11+2	0	0	0	0	0
10	FW	(England) ENG	Connor Wickham	14	1	3+9	0	1+1	1	0	0
11	FW	(Scotland) SCO	James McFadden	3	0	0+3	0	0	0	0	0
12	DF	(England) ENG	Matthew Kilgallon	8	0	6	0	1	0	1	0
13	GK	(England) ENG	Jordan Pickford	0	0	0	0	0	0	0	0
14	MF	(England) ENG	Jack Colback	40	0	30+5	0	1+1	0	3	0
15	MF	(Wales) WAL	David Vaughan	28	1	6+18	1	2	0	2	0
16	DF	(Republic of Ireland) IRL	John O'Shea	36	2	34	2	0	0	2	0
18	DF	(Senegal) SEN	Kader Mangane	2	0	0+2	0	0	0	0	0
19	DF	(England) ENG	Titus Bramble	19	0	12+4	0	2	0	1	0
20	GK	(Republic of Ireland) IRL	Keiren Westwood	3	0	0	0	0	0	3	0
21	MF	(England) ENG	Adam Johnson	40	5	35	5	2	0	2+1	0
22	GK	(Belgium) BEL	Simon Mignolet	40	0	38	0	2	0	0	0
23	MF	(Republic of Ireland) IRL	James McClean	41	5	24+12	2	2	0	2+1	3
24	DF	(Spain) ESP	Carlos Cuéllar	28	1	26	1	1	0	1	0
26	FW	(Scotland) SCO	Steven Fletcher	31	11	28	11	1	0	2	0
28	FW	(Benin) BEN	Stéphane Sessègnon	36	7	34+1	7	1	0	0	0
30	FW	(France) FRA	Mikael Mandron	2	0	0+2	0	0	0	0	0
33	FW	(England) ENG	Ryan Noble	0	0	0	0	0	0	0	0
34	MF	(England) ENG	Billy Knott	1	0	0+1	0	0	0	0	0
37	FW	(Republic of Ireland) IRL	Adam Mitchell	1	0	0+1	0	0	0	0	0
42	DF	(Republic of Ireland) IRL	John Egan	0	0	0	0	0	0	0	0
Players that played for Sunderland this season that have left the club/are currently out on loan:
9	FW	(England) ENG	Fraizer Campbell	15	1	1+11	1	0+1	0	0+2	0
11	MF	(England) ENG	Kieran Richardson	1	0	1	0	0	0	0	0
17	FW	(South Korea) KOR	Ji Dong-won	0	0	0	0	0	0	0	0
18	MF	(Republic of Ireland) IRL	David Meyler	5	0	0+3	0	0	0	1+1	0
11	FW	(Scotland) SCO	James McFadden	3	0	0+3	0	0	0	0	0
25	FW	(France) FRA	Louis Saha	14	0	0+11	0	0	0	2+1	0
27	MF	(Egypt) EGY	Ahmed Elmohamady	2	0	0+2	0	0	0	0	0
34	DF	(England) ENG	Blair Adams	0	0	0	0	0	0	0	0

=== Goalscorers ===
Position	Nation	Number	Name	Premier League	FA Cup	League Cup	Total
FW	(Scotland)	26	Steven Fletcher	11	0	0	11
MF	(England)	8	Craig Gardner	6	1	1	8
FW	(Benin)	28	Stéphane Sessègnon	7	0	0	7
MF	(England)	21	Adam Johnson	5	0	0	5
MF	(Republic of Ireland)	23	James McClean	2	0	3	5
DF	(Republic of Ireland)	16	John O'Shea	2	0	0	2
DF	(Scotland)	2	Phil Bardsley	1	0	0	1
FW	(England)	9	Fraizer Campbell	1	0	0	1
DF	(Spain)	24	Carlos Cuéllar	1	0	0	1
MF	(Sweden)	7	Sebastian Larsson	1	0	0	1
DF	(England)	3	Danny Rose	1	0	0	1
MF	(Wales)	15	David Vaughan	1	0	0	1
FW	(England)	10	Connor Wickham	0	1	0	1
			Own goals	2	0	0	2
			Totals	41	2	4	47

=== Overall ===
Games played	30 (25 Premier League, 3 League Cup, 2 FA Cup)
Games won	9 (7 Premier League, 2 League Cup)
Games drawn	9 (8 Premier League, 1 FA Cup)
Games lost	12 (10 Premier League, 1 League Cup, 1 FA Cup)
Goals scored	34 (28 Premier League, 4 League Cup, 2 FA Cup)
Goals conceded	38 (33 Premier League, 1 League Cup, 4 FA Cup)
Goal difference	-4
Clean sheets	11 (9 Premier League, 2 League Cup)
Most appearances	Stéphane Sessègnon 28
Top scorer	Steven Fletcher 10

== Players ==
=== Squad ===
Note: Flags indicate national team as defined under FIFA eligibility rules; some limited exceptions apply. Players may hold more than one non-FIFA nationality.

No.	Pos.	Nation	Player
2	DF	SCO	Phil Bardsley
3	DF	ENG	Danny Rose (on loan from Tottenham Hotspur)
4	MF	FRA	Alfred N'Diaye
5	DF	ENG	Wes Brown
6	MF	ENG	Lee Cattermole (captain)
7	MF	SWE	Sebastian Larsson
8	MF	ENG	Craig Gardner
9	FW	ENG	Danny Graham
12	DF	ENG	Matthew Kilgallon
13	GK	ENG	Jordan Pickford
14	MF	ENG	Jack Colback
15	MF	WAL	David Vaughan

No.	Pos.	Nation	Player
16	DF	IRL	John O'Shea
18	DF	SEN	Kader Mangane (on loan from Al-Hilal)
19	DF	ENG	Titus Bramble
20	GK	IRL	Keiren Westwood
21	MF	ENG	Adam Johnson
22	GK	BEL	Simon Mignolet
23	MF	IRL	James McClean
24	DF	ESP	Carlos Cuéllar
26	FW	SCO	Steven Fletcher
28	FW	BEN	Stéphane Sessègnon
33	FW	ENG	Ryan Noble
42	DF	IRL	John Egan

== Transfers ==
=== In ===
No.	Pos.	Nat.	Name	Age	EU	Moving from	Type	Transfer window	Ends	Transfer fee	Source
24	DF	(Spain)	Carlos Cuéllar	30	EU	Aston Villa	Transfer	Summer	2014	Free	
	DF	(England)	David Ferguson	18	EU	Darlington	Transfer	Summer	2013	Free	
	MF	(England)	Wade Joyce	18	EU	Bury	Transfer	Summer	2013	Free	
25	FW	(France)	Louis Saha	34	EU	Tottenham Hotspur	Transfer	Summer	2013	Free	
26	FW	(Scotland)	Steven Fletcher	25	EU	Wolverhampton Wanderers	Transfer	Summer	2016	£12 million	
21	MF	(England)	Adam Johnson	25	EU	Manchester City	Transfer	Summer	2016	£12 million	
3	DF	(England)	Danny Rose	22	EU	Tottenham Hotspur	Loan	Summer	2013	Loan	
	FW	(England)	Scott Harrison	19	EU	Darlington	Transfer	None	2013	Free	
11	FW	(Scotland)	James McFadden	29	EU	Everton	Transfer	None	January 2013	Free	
4	MF	(France)	Alfred N'Diaye	22	EU	Bursaspor (Turkey)	Transfer	Winter	2016	£3.8 million	
18	DF	(Senegal)	Kader Mangane	29	EU	Al-Hilal (Saudi Arabia)	Loan	Winter	2013	Loan	
9	FW	(England)	Danny Graham	27	EU	Swansea City (Wales)	Transfer	Winter	2016	£5 million	

=== Out ===
No.	Pos.	Nat.	Name	Age	EU	Moving to	Type	Transfer window	Transfer fee	Source
	GK	(Scotland)	Craig Gordon	29	EU	Free agent	Contract expired	Summer		Sky Sports
	DF	(Northern Ireland)	Liam Bagnall	20	EU	Free agent	Contract expired	Summer		Sky Sports
1	GK	(Northern Ireland)	Trevor Carson	24	EU	Bury	Contract expired	Summer		Sky Sports
16	MF	(Paraguay)	Cristian Riveros	29	Non-EU	Kayserispor (Turkey)	Transfer	Summer		Goal.com
3	DF	(Northern Ireland)	George McCartney	31	EU	West Ham United	Transfer	Summer		SAFC
3	FW	(Ghana)	Asamoah Gyan	26	Non-EU	Al Ain (United Arab Emirates)	Transfer	Summer		Goal.com
17	FW	(England)	Jordan Cook	22	EU	Charlton Athletic	Contract expired	Summer		CAFC
3	DF	(England)	Michael Liddle	22	EU	Accrington Stanley	Transfer	Summer		Sky Sports
14	DF	(Argentina)	Marcos Angeleri	29	Non-EU	Estudiantes (Argentina)	Transfer	Summer		Sky Sports
6	DF	(England)	Michael Turner	28	EU	Norwich City	Transfer	Summer		Sky Sports
21	GK	(England)	Lewis King	19	EU	Stockport County	Contract expired	Summer		Stockport County
27	MF	(Egypt)	Ahmed Elmohamady	24	Non-EU	Hull City	Loan	Summer		SAFC
6	MF	(England)	Brett Elliott	19	EU	University of Charleston (United States)	Contract expired	Summer		UC Golden Eagles
15	MF	(England)	Kieran Richardson	27	EU	Fulham	Transfer	Summer		Sky Sports
	FW	(France)	Oumare Tounkara	22	EU	Red Star (France)	Contract expired	Summer		Soccerway
24	FW	(England)	Craig Lynch	20	EU	Hartlepool United	Loan	None		SAFC
27	GK	(England)	Ben Wilson	20	EU	Chesterfield	Loan	None		SAFC
35	FW	(England)	Ryan Noble	21	EU	Hartlepool	Loan	None		SAFC
34	MF	(England)	Billy Knott	19	EU	Woking	Loan	None		SAFC
22	DF	(Republic of Ireland)	John Egan	20	EU	Bradford City	Loan	None		Sky Sports
31	MF	(Republic of Ireland)	David Meyler	23	EU	Hull City	Loan	None		Hull City AFC
39	DF	(England)	Blair Adams	21	EU	Coventry City	Loan	None		SAFC
	MF	(England)	Nathan Thomas	18	EU	Darlington 1883	Youth Loan	None		SAFC
	DF	(England)	Johnny Burn	18	EU	Darlington 1883	Youth Loan	None		SAFC
27	FW	(South Korea)	Ji Dong-won	21	Non-EU	FC Augsburg (Germany)	Loan	Winter		SAFC
31	MF	(Republic of Ireland)	David Meyler	23	EU	Hull City	Transfer	Winter		SAFC
39	DF	(England)	Blair Adams	21	EU	Coventry City	Transfer	Winter		SAFC
27	FW	(England)	Fraizer Campbell	25	EU	Cardiff City (Wales)	Transfer	Winter		SAFC
7	MF	(England)	Adam Reed	21	EU	Portsmouth	Loan	Winter		SAFC
	FW	(Scotland)	James McFadden	29	EU	Motherwell (Scotland)	Contract expired	Winter		SAFC
25	GK	(England)	Jonny Maddison	18	EU	Crawley Town	Youth Loan	Winter		SAFC
27	MF	(Egypt)	Ahmed Elmohamady	25	Non-EU	Hull City	Loan	Winter		SAFC
28	FW	(France)	Louis Saha	34	EU	Lazio (Italy)	Mutual Consent	Winter		SAFC
22	FW	(England)	Connor Wickham	19	EU	Sheffield Wednesday	Loan	None		SAFC
	GK	(England)	Joel Dixon	18	EU	Workington	Youth Loan	None		Workington AFC

EU = if holds or not a European Union passport; Country: when 2 flags, 1st flag = country that plays for internationally, 2nd flag = country of birth; N = number on jersey; P = Position (for position name, pause mouse pointer on abbreviation); Name = Name on jersey (for more extensive name, pause mouse pointer on name); Age = age on the day of the signing; Moving from = only indicate the club the player was playing before start playing for this club in this season, for the type of the moving see Status column; Moving to = only indicates the club the player is going to play next, for the type of the moving see Status column; Ends = when the player's current contract ends; n/a = Not applicable.

== Awards ==
=== Individual awards ===
Award	Month/Round/Year	Winner
Premier League Player of the Month	September	Steven Fletcher
North-East Football Writers' Association's Player of the Year	2012	Simon Mignolet

== See also ==
- Sunderland A.F.C. seasons
