= Adam Mitchell (footballer, born 1993) =

English footballer

Personal information
- Full name: Adam John Mitchell
- Date of birth: 18 October 1993 (age 33)
- Place of birth: Barnard Castle, England
- Position: Winger

Team information
- Current team: Spennymoor Town

Youth career
- 2010–2013: Sunderland

Senior career*
Years	Team	Apps	(Gls)
2013–2014	Sunderland	1	(0)
2013	→ Harrogate Town (loan)	3	(0)
2014	→ Darlington 1883 (loan)	0	(0)
2014–2016	Darlington 1883		
2016–	Spennymoor Town		
- * Club domestic league appearances and goals as of 19:25, 8 April 2015 (UTC)

Adam John Mitchell (born 18 October 1993) is an English professional footballer who plays for Spennymoor Town, as a winger. He began his career at Premier League side Sunderland, for whom he made one professional appearance.

== Career ==
=== Sunderland ===
Mitchell began his career as a schoolboy with Premier League side Sunderland. He signed a scholarship deal in 2010 and made 54 appearances and scored 11 goals for the youth team during the 2010–11 and 2011–12 seasons. He made his reserve team debut towards the end of the 2010/11 season and made nine appearances and scored one goal during the 2011–12 season. Mitchell signed his first professional contract in 2012 and made 22 U21 Premier League appearances for the Development Squad during the 2012–13 season. He was rewarded for his progress by manager Paolo Di Canio picking him for the first team squad for the first time for the final game of the Premier League season against Tottenham Hotspur on 19 May 2013. Allotted the number 37 shirt, Mitchell made his professional debut when he replaced Danny Graham after 88 minutes in the 1–0 defeat. Mitchell failed to receive a call into the first team during the 2013/14 season, but made 15 Development Squad appearances and scored three goals. Mitchell was released by the Black Cats in March 2014.

==== Harrogate Town (loan) ====
Mitchell signed on a one-month loan for Conference North side Harrogate Town in November 2013. He made six appearances for the club without scoring.

=== Darlington 1883 ===
Mitchell joined Northern Premier League Division One North side Darlington 1883 on 21 March 2014, on a loan deal running until the end of the 2013–14 season. It was reported on 10 April that Mitchell had been invited to a trial at League One side Brentford, but a deal failed to materialise. He signed permanently in the summer. In March 2015 he went on trial with Gillingham.

=== Spennymoor Town ===
On 31 October 2016, Mitchell joined Spennymoor Town.

== Career statistics ==
As of 22 January 2014

Appearances and goals by club, season and competition
Club	Season	League		FA Cup		League Cup		Other		Total	
Club	Season	Apps	Goals	Apps	Goals	Apps	Goals	Apps	Goals	Apps	Goals
Sunderland	2012–13	1	0	0	0	0	0	0	0	1	0
Sunderland	2013–14	0	0	0	0	0	0	0	0	0	0
Sunderland	Total	1	0	0	0	0	0	0	0	1	0
Harrogate Town (loan)	2013–14	3	0	0	0	0	0	3	0	6	0
Career total		4	0	0	0	0	0	3	0	7	0
