= Craig Gardner =

English footballer (born 1986)

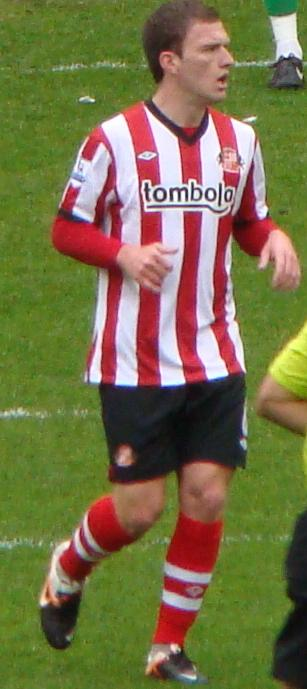
- Gardner playing for Sunderland in 2012

Personal information
- Full name: Craig Gardner
- Date of birth: 25 November 1986 (age 39)
- Place of birth: Solihull, England
- Height: 5 ft 10 in (1.78 m)
- Position: Central midfielder

Youth career
- –2005: Aston Villa

Senior career*
Years	Team	Apps	(Gls)
2005–2010	Aston Villa	59	(5)
2010–2011	Birmingham City	42	(9)
2011–2014	Sunderland	81	(11)
2014–2017	West Bromwich Albion	78	(6)
2017	→ Birmingham City (loan)	20	(2)
2017–2020	Birmingham City	47	(3)
Total		327	(36)

International career
2007–2009	England U21	14	(2)

Managerial career
- 2020: Birmingham City (caretaker)
Medal record
Men's football
Representing England
UEFA European Under-21 Championship
Runner-up	2009 Sweden
- * Club domestic league appearances and goals

Craig Gardner (born 25 November 1986) is an English professional football coach and former player who made 260 appearances in the Premier League and a further 67 in the Championship. He joined the coaching staff at Birmingham City in January 2021, was appointed technical director in June, and was promoted to director of football in February 2025, a role he held until leaving the club in June 2026.

A versatile midfielder, Gardner was able to play in many different positions, although he preferred central midfield. He began his career at Aston Villa before spending the 2010–11 season with city rivals Birmingham City, with whom he won the 2011 League Cup. After three seasons with Sunderland, he joined West Bromwich Albion in 2014 before rejoining Birmingham City in 2017. He retired from playing in 2020 to take up a position as first-team coach at the club. He moved on to a similar role at Sheffield Wednesday in November 2020, before leaving a month later when Tony Pulis' contract was terminated and returning to Birmingham.

Internationally, Gardner represented England at under-21 level, and was a member of the team that finished as runners-up on the 2009 European Championships.

== Club career ==
=== Aston Villa ===
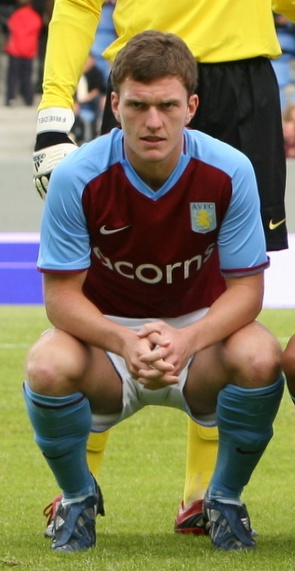
Gardner playing for Aston Villa in 2008

Gardner came through Aston Villa's youth system and turned professional on 31 January 2005. He made his Premier League debut on 26 December 2005, when he came on as a substitute for Steven Davis against Everton at Villa Park. He scored his first professional goal for Villa in the 3–1 away win on 14 April against Middlesbrough. He also netted a contender for goal of the month on the last day of the season away to Bolton Wanderers. After a series of appearances Villa manager Martin O'Neill entered contract talks with Gardner.

In August 2007, Gardner signed a new four-year deal, which ran until June 2011. On 1 October 2007 he scored twice in two games with two free kicks. First he scored away to Tottenham Hotspur in a 4–4 draw and then the winner against West Ham United five days later with a deflected attempt.

On 1 December 2007, Gardner scored the opener in a home match against Arsenal. Villa went on to lose the match 2–1. Gardner has often played in the right-back slot, and impressed both O'Neill and his captain, Gareth Barry, who said that Gardner could be a key player for years to come.

Gardner made just one appearance for Villa in the 2009–10 season because of a groin injury. On 4 January 2010 it was announced that Birmingham City were preparing a £3.5 million bid. However it was revealed that Aston Villa had turned down the bid for the player. However, the club later offered a second deal including add-ons that was accepted by Aston Villa. He made exactly 80 appearances for Villa in all competitions.

=== Birmingham City ===
Gardner signed a four-and-a-half-year contract with Birmingham City on 26 January 2010 for a fee reported as £3m plus £500,000 in add-ons. He made his debut on 7 February as a 68th-minute substitute, and set up the first of Kevin Phillips' goals as Birmingham came back to beat Midlands rivals Wolverhampton Wanderers 2–1. He scored his first goal for the club against Everton on 13 March. Towards the end of the season Gardner was preferred to Sebastian Larsson on the right of midfield. Restored to his favoured central position, he scored twice in the first home game of the 2010–11 season as Birmingham came from behind to beat Blackburn Rovers 2–1, and scored again in the next game away at Bolton Wanderers. Gardner's winning goal in extra time against West Ham United took Birmingham City through to the 2011 Football League Cup Final, and he was in the starting eleven as Birmingham won their first major trophy since 1963. He was the team's top scorer in the 2010–11 season with eight League goals, ten in all competitions, as Birmingham were relegated to the Championship.

=== Sunderland ===
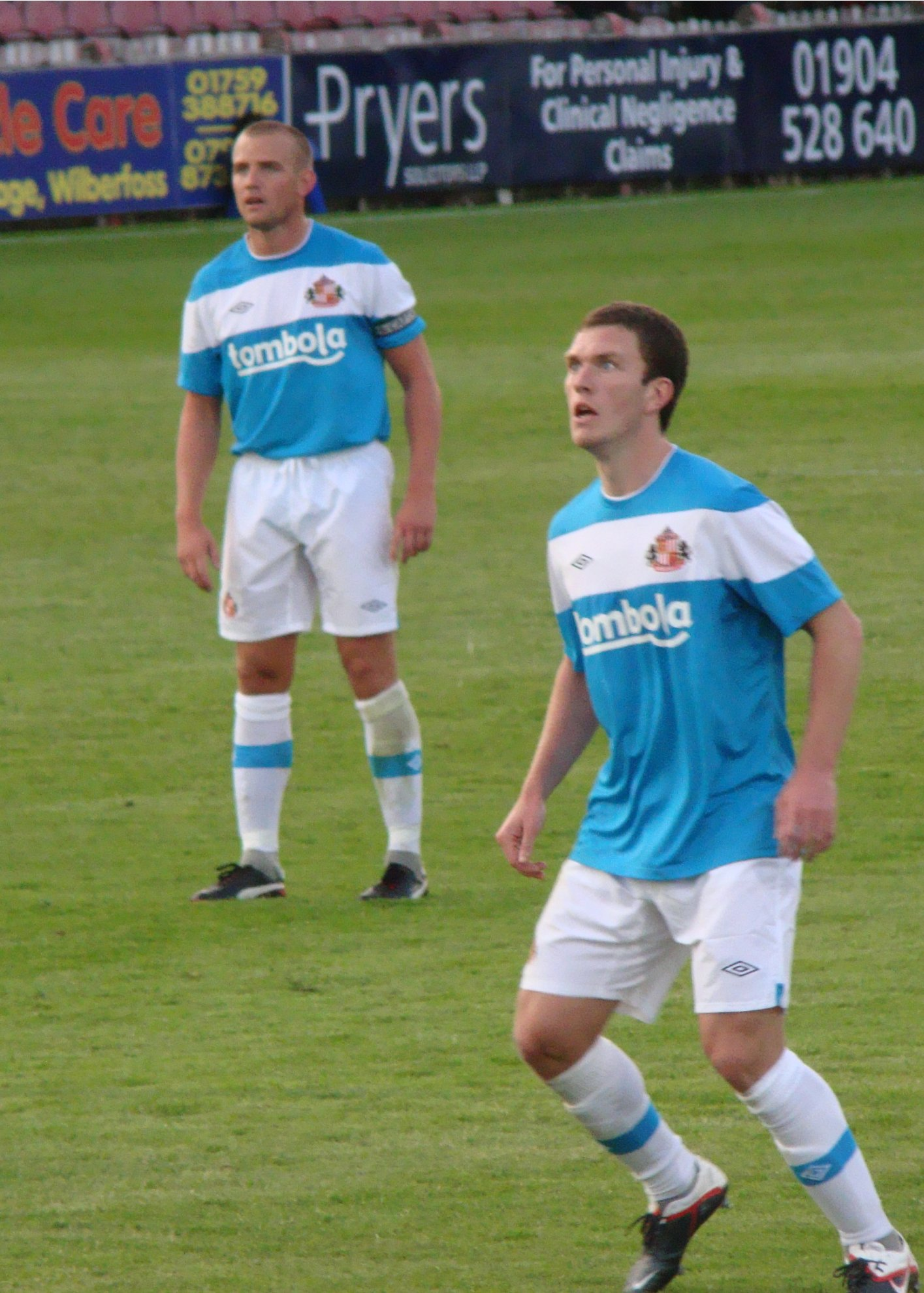
Gardner (right) and Lee Cattermole playing for Sunderland in a pre-season friendly against York City

Gardner signed a three-year deal with Sunderland for an undisclosed fee, believed by BBC Sport to be about £6 million, on 30 June 2011. Gardner made his debut as a substitute in the home defeat to Newcastle United on 20 August, and scored his first competitive goal on 18 September 2011 with a deflected shot that looped over goalkeeper Asmir Begović as Sunderland beat Stoke City 4–0 at home to secure their first win of the season. Gardner fell out of favour at Sunderland, and was linked with a departure in the January transfer window. However, he was re-united with former boss O'Neill when he replaced Steve Bruce as Sunderland manager in December 2011, and this prompted a change in fortune for Gardner and the Black Cats. Gardner was deployed at right back against Manchester City on New Year's Day 2012 due to an injury crisis, and helped Sunderland to a shock 1–0 win against the league leaders. Two days later Gardner, again playing at right back, scored his second goal for Sunderland, direct from a free kick 30 yards away from goal in their 4–1 away win at Wigan. Gardner was rumoured to be homesick at Sunderland in the press, and was linked with a move back to the Midlands. Sunderland rejected a loan bid for Gardner from former club Birmingham City on 19 January. Gardner scored a stunning volley from 25 yards late on in Sunderland's 2–0 win over Swansea City on 21 January.

Gardner remained at Sunderland for the 2012–13 season, dismissing rumours that he was unsettled on Wearside. He was deployed as a right-back by O'Neill for much of the season. His first goal of the season came from a direct free kick against MK Dons in a 2–0 League Cup victory on 25 September. Gardner scored again from a free kick in a 2–4 home defeat against West Bromwich Albion, and scored a consolation goal in a 2–1 loss at Norwich City in December. On 5 January, Gardner scored a late equaliser in their FA Cup third round tie away at Bolton Wanderers with a powerful strike from the edge of the box, earning Sunderland a replay. He scored a penalty as Sunderland lost 2–1 at Reading in January. In March, Gardner conceded a penalty by bringing down Ashkan Dejagah in the box, but made amends by scoring another penalty to help Sunderland draw 2–2. Gardner scored yet another penalty as Sunderland drew at home to Norwich later that month, bringing his tally for the season to eight. Despite Gardner's goals, Sunderland were on a run of eight games without a win, and following a home defeat to Manchester United, O'Neill was sacked and replaced by Paolo Di Canio. Gardner started Di Canio's first game in charge, a 2–1 loss at Chelsea, and picked up his tenth yellow card of the season. As a result, Gardner missed the Tyne-Wear derby at Newcastle through suspension. However, Di Canio allowed Gardner to travel to the game with Sunderland supporters and watch the game with the fans in the away end. Gardner was seen singing with Sunderland fans on the Metro journey to Tyneside, and celebrating as Sunderland beat their rivals 3–0. Gardner returned to the team following his suspension, but against Stoke was shown a straight red card for a challenge on Charlie Adam, ending his season prematurely.

Gardner scored his first goal of the 2013–14 season from the penalty spot in a 3–1 home defeat to Arsenal. He also opened the scoring against Manchester United a few weeks later, although Sunderland went on to lose 2–1. Gardner scored the only goal of the FA Cup fifth-round tie against Southampton when he "unleashed a 20-yard shot which arced imperiously before brushing the underside of the bar as it dipped en route to the top corner".

=== West Bromwich Albion ===
On 20 May 2014, Gardner signed a three-year deal with West Bromwich Albion, to begin when his Sunderland contract expired at the end of the 2013–14 season. He scored his first goal for the club in a 1–0 victory against his former club Aston Villa.

=== Return to Birmingham City ===
On 11 January 2017, Gardner returned to Birmingham City on loan until the end of the season, after which the transfer would become a three-year permanent deal with an option for a fourth year. The fee was undisclosed, but the Birmingham Mail believed it to be in excess of £1 million. The deal was made permanent on 11 May 2017. He was appointed player-coach in November 2019, with the intention of becoming first-team coach on a permanent basis on 1 July 2020 after his playing contract expired. He finished his second spell with Birmingham with 73 appearances in all competitions, and over a 15-year playing career made 327 league appearances, of which 260 were in the Premier League.

== International career ==
Gardner was a member of the England under-21 team that played at the 2009 European Championships. He appeared in two group matches and was a second-half substitute in the final, which England lost 4–0 to Germany.

== After playing ==
Gardner had acted as Birmingham City's player-coach during the 2019–20 season under Pep Clotet's management, and took up a permanent position as first-team coach on 1 July. The club had announced that Clotet would leave at the end of the season, which had been extended because of the coronavirus pandemic, but after a series of poor results, he left on 8 July. Gardner and Steve Spooner finished the season in joint charge, presiding over a draw and three defeats as Birmingham avoided relegation on the final day of the season.

Gardner initially remained in post after new head coach Aitor Karanka brought in his own staff, but left the club in November to join the coaching staff at Sheffield Wednesday under newly appointed manager Tony Pulis, with whom he had worked at West Bromwich Albion. His spell lasted just over a month, as he left the club when Pulis was sacked on 28 December 2020. He returned to Birmingham's coaching staff in early January 2021, and was appointed technical director in June. After the club was taken over in July 2023, the new chairman expressed the owners' gratitude to Gardner, "without [whose] help we would never have completed this transaction. He deserves an enormous amount of credit in helping to shepherd the transaction over the finish line." In February 2025, Gardner was promoted to director of football.

Gardner left his position as Birmingham director of football on 5 June 2026.

== Personal life ==
Gardner was born in Solihull and raised in the Yardley district of Birmingham, where he attended Cockshut Hill School. After transferring to Birmingham City in 2010, he said he was a lifelong Birmingham City supporter. His younger brother Gary Gardner also played for England at youth level and turned professional with Aston Villa. In June 2012, Gardner donated £500 to the family of a disabled toddler after a chance meeting in a department store; this was only revealed after the Stoke-on-Trent family told a local newspaper.

== Career statistics ==
Appearances and goals by club, season and competition
Club	Season	League			FA Cup		League Cup		Other		Total	
Club	Season	Division	Apps	Goals	Apps	Goals	Apps	Goals	Apps	Goals	Apps	Goals
Aston Villa	2005–06	Premier League	8	0	1	0	0	0	—		9	0
Aston Villa	2006–07	Premier League	13	2	0	0	0	0	—		13	2
Aston Villa	2007–08	Premier League	23	3	1	0	1	0	—		25	3
Aston Villa	2008–09	Premier League	14	0	4	0	1	0	11 (Note: Two appearances in UEFA Intertoto Cup, nine appearances and one goal in UEFA Cup)	1	30	1
Aston Villa	2009–10	Premier League	1	0	0	0	1	0	1 (Note: Appearance in UEFA Europa League)	0	3	0
Aston Villa	Total		59	5	6	0	3	0	12	1	80	6
Birmingham City	2009–10	Premier League	13	1	2	0	—		—		15	1
Birmingham City	2010–11	Premier League	29	8	2	0	6	2	—		37	10
Birmingham City	Total		42	9	4	0	6	2	—		52	11
Sunderland	2011–12	Premier League	30	3	6	0	1	0	—		37	3
Sunderland	2012–13	Premier League	33	6	2	1	2	1	—		37	8
Sunderland	2013–14	Premier League	18	2	3	1	5	0	—		26	3
Sunderland	Total		81	11	11	2	8	1	—		100	14
West Bromwich Albion	2014–15	Premier League	35	3	3	0	0	0	—		38	3
West Bromwich Albion	2015–16	Premier League	34	3	3	0	1	0	—		38	3
West Bromwich Albion	2016–17	Premier League	9	0	0	0	0	0	—		9	0
West Bromwich Albion	Total		78	6	6	0	1	0	—		85	6
West Bromwich Albion U23	2016–17	—			—		—		1 (Note: Appearance in EFL Trophy)	0	1	0
Birmingham City (loan)	2016–17	Championship	20	2	—		—		—		20	2
Birmingham City	2017–18	Championship	26	2	3	0	1	0	—		30	2
Birmingham City	2018–19	Championship	21	1	1	0	0	0	—		22	1
Birmingham City	2019–20	Championship	0	0	0	0	1	0	—		1	0
Birmingham City	Total		67	5	4	0	2	0	—		73	5
Career total			327	36	31	2	20	3	13	1	391	42

== Honours ==
Birmingham City

- Football League Cup: 2010–11

Sunderland

- Football League Cup runner-up: 2013–14

England U21

- UEFA European Under-21 Championship runner-up: 2009
