= Phil Bardsley =

Scottish footballer (born 1985)

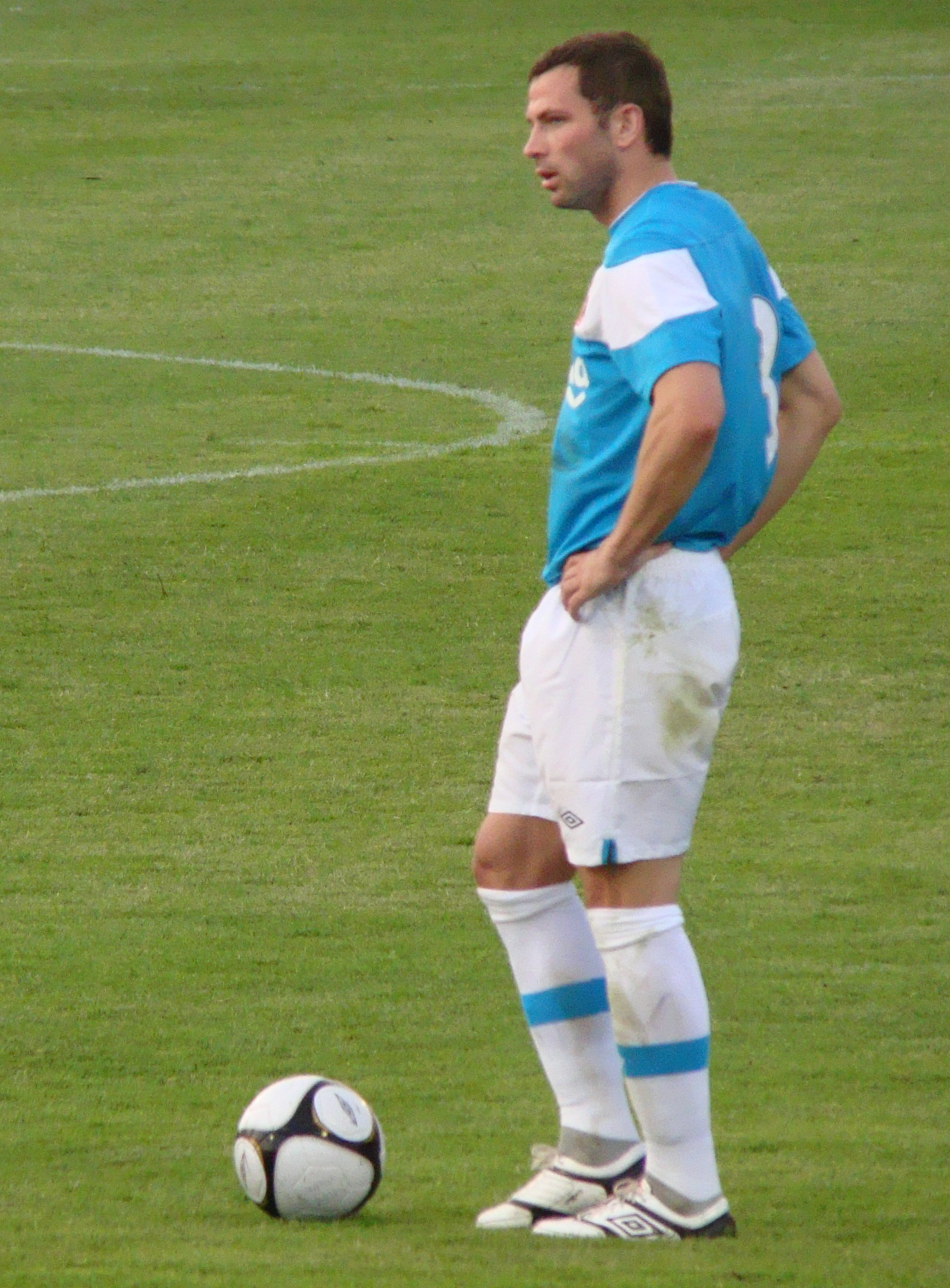
- Bardsley playing for Sunderland in 2011

Personal information
- Full name: Phillip Anthony Bardsley
- Date of birth: 28 June 1985 (age 41)
- Place of birth: Salford, England
- Height: 5 ft 11 in (1.80 m)
- Position: Full back

Team information
- Current team: Macclesfield (assistant manager)

Youth career
- 1993: Charlestown Lads Club
- 1993–2003: Manchester United

Senior career*
Years	Team	Apps	(Gls)
2003–2008	Manchester United	8	(0)
2004	→ Royal Antwerp (loan)	6	(0)
2006	→ Burnley (loan)	6	(0)
2006	→ Rangers (loan)	5	(1)
2007	→ Aston Villa (loan)	13	(0)
2007–2008	→ Sheffield United (loan)	16	(0)
2008–2014	Sunderland	174	(7)
2014–2017	Stoke City	51	(0)
2017–2022	Burnley	57	(0)
2022–2023	Stockport County	2	(0)
Total		338	(8)

International career^{‡}
2010–2014	Scotland	13	(0)
- * Club domestic league appearances and goals as of 09:43, 27 June 2023 (UTC) ‡ National team caps and goals as of 15 March 2014

Phillip Anthony Bardsley (born 28 June 1985) is a former professional footballer who played as a full back. He also played international football for the Scotland national team.

Bardsley began his career with Manchester United where he made 18 appearances in five seasons at the club. During that time, he was loaned to several clubs, including Royal Antwerp, Burnley, Rangers, Aston Villa and Sheffield United.

He joined Sunderland in January 2008 for an initial fee of £850,000. Bardsley established himself as a regular at the Stadium of Light under Steve Bruce and Martin O'Neill and he won the player of the year award in 2010–11. He lost his place in the team in 2012–13 after a falling-out with manager Paolo Di Canio, before returning to the first team under Gus Poyet. Under Poyet, Bardsley helped Sunderland to avoid relegation in 2013–14 and reach the 2014 Football League Cup final, in which they lost 3–1 to Manchester City.

After his Sunderland contract expired in June 2014, Bardsley joined Stoke City on a free transfer. He spent three seasons with the club before joining Burnley in July 2017. Bardsley ended his career at Stockport County.

== Early life ==
Born at Hope Hospital in Salford, Bardsley attended Hope High School along with former United teammates Mark Redshaw and Mark Howard. Bardsley started his career with Charlestown Lads Club also with Redshaw before signing for Manchester United. He grew up near Manchester United's old training ground, The Cliff, and would often go there on his school holidays to watch the players train. Prior to his departure for Sunderland, he was the only current player who progressed through all the levels of the academy, starting out at the club at the age of 8.

== Club career ==
=== Manchester United ===
After coming through the club's youth system, Bardsley was a regular in Manchester United's under-17 team from the 2000–01 season, before progressing to the under-19s from the 2002–03 season. He continued in the under-19s in 2003–04, but appeared more frequently in the reserves before making his first-team debut in a 2–0 defeat to West Bromwich Albion on 3 December 2003 in the fourth round of the League Cup. He made a second appearance for the first team in the 3–0 FA Cup fourth round win over Northampton Town on 25 January 2004, before going on a four-month loan to Manchester United's Belgian feeder club, Royal Antwerp, on 30 January. He made six appearances for Royal Antwerp, including a 4–0 defeat to Club Brugge on 8 February 2004, in which he was sent off for two bookable offences.

After returning to Manchester United at the end of 2003–04, Bardsley made three appearances on the club's 2004–05 pre-season tour of the United States, playing against Bayern Munich, Celtic and Milan. He made another promising start to the 2005–06 season, and an injury to Gary Neville gave him plenty of opportunities to play between August and November 2005. He was regularly named as a substitute for much of the rest of the season, before going on loan to Championship club Burnley on 16 March 2006. He played six matches and scored an own goal in the first minute of a 1–1 draw at home to Southampton.

==== Loan to Rangers ====
Bardsley again made a significant contribution to Manchester United's pre-season programme in 2006–07, but on 16 August, he was sent out on loan again, this time to Scottish Premier League club Rangers. On 9 September 2006, he scored his only goal for Rangers against Falkirk with a terrific long-range free kick. He was sent off against Hibernian, and therefore missed the Old Firm match against Celtic. On 17 October, it was reported that Bardsley was involved in a training ground disagreement with manager Paul Le Guen and his future at Rangers appeared to be in doubt. Indeed, Bardsley never played for Rangers again and returned to Manchester United in December.

==== Loan to Aston Villa ====
On 8 January 2007, Bardsley joined Aston Villa on loan until the end of the season and played his first Premier League match against Watford on 20 January. It was announced on 1 May that Bardsley would be returning to Manchester United when his loan deal with Villa ran out as manager Martin O'Neill did not want to make the move permanent.

==== Loan to Sheffield United ====
After playing what would turn out to be his last match for the Manchester United first team against Coventry City in the League Cup on 26 September 2007, it was confirmed on 15 October Bardsley would join Sheffield United on loan until January 2008. He made his full debut for the Blades a few days later in a 1–1 draw with Preston North End at Bramall Lane. Despite Sheffield United agreeing a deal with Manchester United to sign him permanently, Bardsley left at the end of his loan deal in January 2008 after playing 16 matches.

=== Sunderland ===
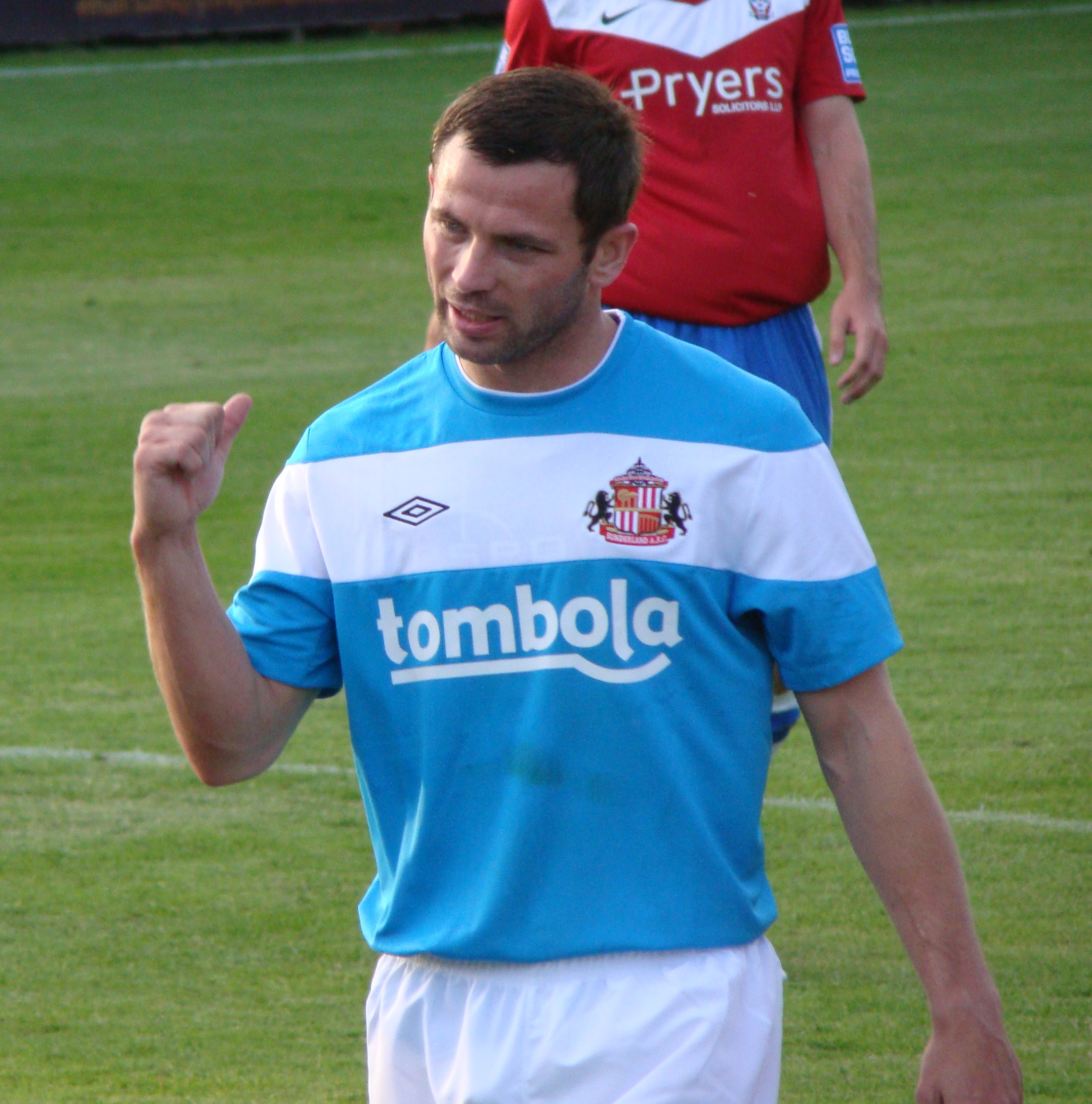
Bardsley for Sunderland in a pre-season friendly against York City

On 22 January 2008, Bardsley joined Sunderland on a three-and-a-half-year contract in a deal worth an initial £850,000, potentially rising to £2 million. He made his debut in a 2–0 win against Birmingham City in the Premier League on 29 January. Bardsley played 11 times under Roy Keane in 2007–08 as Sunderland successfully avoided relegation by three points. On 27 August 2008 Bardsley scored his first goal in English football in a 2–1 victory against Nottingham Forest in the League Cup. Bardsley lost out to Pascal Chimbonda during the first half of the 2008–09 campaign before regaining his place in the team in November 2008. He retained his place under Ricky Sbragia, playing in total 33 times in 2008–09 as Sunderland survived relegation on the final day of the season.

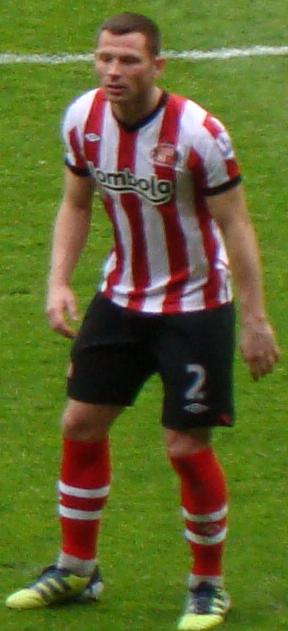
Bardsley playing for Sunderland in 2012

Bardsley kept his place under new manager Steve Bruce for the first half of the 2009–10 season until loan signing Alan Hutton took his place in February 2010. From there until the end of the campaign Bardsley was mainly used as a substitute and due his lack of playing time, Bardsley stated that he may have to consider leaving. However Hutton didn't make his move permanent and Bardsley was able to reclaim his place in the side and in November 2010, he signed a new three-and-a-half-year deal running until summer 2014. He scored his first league goal against Aston Villa on 5 January 2011 with a 25-yard strike in a 1–0 win. He then scored his second of the season with another long range strike against Chelsea on 1 February 2012 in a 4–2 defeat. He scored another long-range goal on 9 April 2011 in a 3–2 defeat against West Bromwich Albion. In total Bardsley played 37 times in 2010–11 as the Black Cats finished in 10th position. Bardsley's consistent performances during the campaign earned him the Player of the year award.

Bardsley made a poor start to the 2011–12 season as he was sent-off in a 1–0 defeat against rivals Newcastle United on 21 August 2011. He was then handed a retrospective four-match ban by the FA for an altercation Juan Mata in a 2–1 defeat by Chelsea on 10 September 2011. Despite this Bardsley retained his place in the side under Martin O'Neill, playing a total of 37 matches as Sunderland finished in 13th position. He missed the start of the 2012–13 campaign after undergoing ankle surgery in August 2012. Bardsley returned to the side at the end of October 2012, with the team struggling near the bottom of the table. Paolo Di Canio replaced O'Neill in March 2013 and he guided the team to back to back victories over Newcastle United and Everton lifting the club away from the relegation zone. Bardsley scored in the penultimate match of the season in a 1–1 draw with Southampton on 12 May 2013. Bardsley missed the final match of the season away at Tottenham Hotspur after he and Matthew Kilgallon were pictured visiting a casino, angering Di Canio who vowed never to play the pair again. Di Canio also fined Bardsley as well as six other Sunderland players for "indiscipline" which prompted an investigation by the PFA.

Bardsley began the 2013–14 season playing with the under-21s and whilst playing against Bolton Wanderers on 12 August 2013 he broke his foot ending Di Canio's attempts to sell him. On 20 August 2013, Bardsley was suspended by Sunderland after mocking the club's opening day defeat to Fulham on a social media site. His suspension was lifted on 4 September 2013 after he apologised. Di Canio was sacked and replaced by Gus Poyet in October 2013 and brought Bardsley back into the first-team. He made a poor start on his return, scoring an own goal in a 4–0 defeat away at Swansea City. His form improved thereafter scoring against Southampton in the League Cup and the only goal in a 1–0 win over Manchester City on 10 November 2013. He scored against his former club Manchester United in the 2nd leg of the League Cup semi-final as Sunderland progressed to the final on penalties. Bardsley played the full match of the 2014 Football League Cup final as Sunderland lost 3–1 to Manchester City. Bardsley played a total of 33 times in 2013–14 as Sunderland finished in 14th position.

=== Stoke City ===
With Bardsley's Sunderland contract due to expire at the end of June 2014, other clubs were free to approach him from January 2014. On 22 May 2014, Bardsley signed a three-year contract with Stoke City. He made his Premier League debut for Stoke on the opening day of the 2014–15 season in a 1–0 defeat against Aston Villa. Bardsley established himself as a regular under Mark Hughes but struggled with discipline, picking up nine yellow cards by March 2015. Bardsley played 30 times for Stoke in the 2014–15 season as Stoke finished in 9th position.

Bardsley lost his place in the Stoke squad for the 2015–16 season following the arrival of Glen Johnson from Liverpool. Despite missing out on league appearances Bardsley played a part in Stoke's League Cup campaign. He was sent-off in the fourth round against Chelsea and scored a 30-yard free kick in the quarter-final victory over Sheffield Wednesday. Following injury to Johnson in February, Bardsley took his place back in the side until the end of the season. He made 17 appearances for Stoke in 2015–16 as Stoke again finished in 9th position.

Bardsley scored a rare goal in a 4–0 EFL Cup victory over Stevenage on 23 August 2016. He suffered a knee injury on November which ruled him out for three months. He returned to the side in February but after getting sent-off against Chelsea on 18 March 2017 he was unable to get back into the team. Speaking in April 2017 Bardsley revealed that he is in limbo over whether he will be offered a new contract. Bardsley played 16 times in 2016–17 as Stoke finished in 13th position. He signed a contract extension with Stoke on 26 May 2017.

=== Burnley ===
On 25 July 2017, Bardsley completed a transfer to Premier League club Burnley, signing a two-year contract.

On 7 March 2021, Bardsley agreed a new one-year contract with Burnley, keeping him at the club until the summer of 2022. On 10 June 2022, Burnley announced that Bardsley would be leaving the club when his contract expired at the end of June.

=== Stockport County ===
On 13 December 2022, Bardsley signed for EFL League Two club Stockport County having been training with the club for the six months prior as he looked to return from injury. The move saw Bardsley agreeing to donate the entirety of his salary to the club's community trust.

On 27 June 2023, Bardsley announced he had called an end to his playing career.

== International career ==
On 6 October 2010, Bardsley received a call-up for the Scotland national team for the Euro 2012 qualifier against the Czech Republic on 8 October 2010. He qualifies because his father was born in Glasgow. He made his debut on 11 October 2010 in a 3–2 defeat by World and European champions Spain, filling in for the injured Alan Hutton.

== Style of play ==
Bardsley plays at right-back and describes himself as a modern full-back.

== Coaching career ==
In May 2017, Bardsley took a UEFA B Licence course with the Irish Football Association.

In October 2023, Bardsley was appointed assistant manager of Northern Premier League Premier Division club Macclesfield, assisting former teammate Alex Bruce.

== Personal life ==
Bardsley married model and former reality TV star Tanya Robinson in 2014, with whom he has four children.

== Career statistics ==
=== Club ===
Appearances and goals by club, season and competition
Club	Season	League			FA Cup		League Cup		Other		Total	
Club	Season	Division	Apps	Goals	Apps	Goals	Apps	Goals	Apps	Goals	Apps	Goals
Manchester United	2003–04	Premier League	0	0	1	0	1	0	0	0	2	0
Manchester United	2004–05	Premier League	0	0	0	0	0	0	0	0	0	0
Manchester United	2005–06	Premier League	8	0	2	0	2	0	3 (Note: Appearances in Champions League)	0	15	0
Manchester United	2006–07	Premier League	0	0	0	0	0	0	0	0	0	0
Manchester United	2007–08	Premier League	0	0	0	0	1	0	0	0	1	0
Manchester United	Total		8	0	3	0	4	0	3	0	18	0
Royal Antwerp (loan)	2003–04	Belgian First Division	6	0	0	0	—		—		6	0
Burnley (loan)	2005–06	Championship	6	0	—		—		—		6	0
Rangers (loan)	2006–07	Scottish Premier League	5	1	—		0	0	2 (Note: Appearances in UEFA Cup)	0	7	1
Aston Villa (loan)	2006–07	Premier League	13	0	—		—		—		13	0
Sheffield United (loan)	2007–08	Championship	16	0	—		—		—		16	0
Sunderland	2007–08	Premier League	11	0	—		—		—		11	0
Sunderland	2008–09	Premier League	28	0	2	0	3	1	—		33	1
Sunderland	2009–10	Premier League	26	0	2	0	0	0	—		28	0
Sunderland	2010–11	Premier League	34	3	1	0	2	0	—		37	3
Sunderland	2011–12	Premier League	31	1	6	1	0	0	—		37	2
Sunderland	2012–13	Premier League	18	1	2	0	1	0	—		21	1
Sunderland	2013–14	Premier League	26	2	2	0	5	2	—		33	4
Sunderland	Total		174	7	15	1	11	3	—		200	11
Stoke City	2014–15	Premier League	25	0	3	0	2	0	—		30	0
Stoke City	2015–16	Premier League	11	0	2	0	4	1	—		17	1
Stoke City	2016–17	Premier League	15	0	0	0	1	1	—		16	1
Stoke City	Total		51	0	5	0	7	2	—		63	2
Stoke City U21s	2016–17	—	—		—		—		1 (Note: Appearance in EFL Trophy.)	0	1	0
Burnley	2017–18	Premier League	13	0	0	0	2	0	—		15	0
Burnley	2018–19	Premier League	19	0	0	0	0	0	4 (Note: Appearances in Europa League)	0	23	0
Burnley	2019–20	Premier League	21	0	0	0	1	0	—		22	0
Burnley	2020–21	Premier League	4	0	3	0	1	0	—		8	0
Burnley	2021–22	Premier League	0	0	1	0	2	0	—		3	0
Burnley	Total		57	0	4	0	6	0	4	0	71	0
Stockport County	2022–23	League Two	2	0	0	0	0	0	0	0	2	0
Career total			338	8	27	1	28	5	10	0	403	14

=== International ===
Appearances and goals by national team and year
National team	Year	Apps	Goals
Scotland
Scotland	2010	2	0
Scotland	2011	9	0
Scotland	2012	1	0
Scotland	2014	1	0
Total		13	0

== Honours ==
Manchester United

- FA Community Shield: 2007

Sunderland

- Football League Cup runner-up: 2013–14

Individual

- Sunderland Player of the Year: 2010–11

== See also ==
- List of Scotland international footballers born outside Scotland
