= Adam Reed (footballer, born 1991) =

Filipino footballer

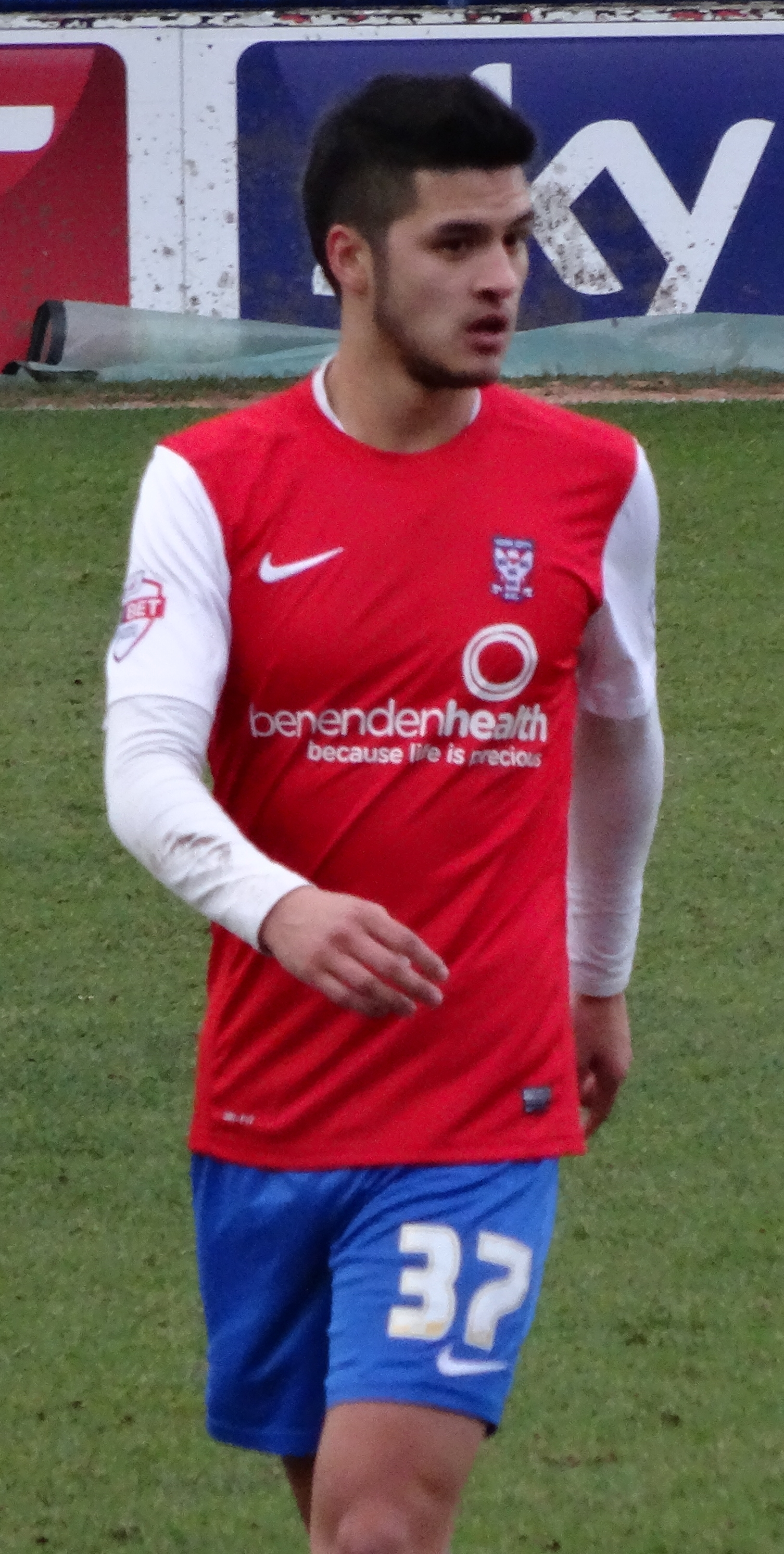
- Reed playing for York City in 2014

Personal information
- Full name: Adam Michael Reed
- Date of birth: 8 May 1991 (age 35)
- Place of birth: Hartlepool, England
- Height: 5 ft 9 in (1.75 m)
- Positions: Defensive midfielder; full-back

Youth career
- –2009: Sunderland

Senior career*
Years	Team	Apps	(Gls)
2009–2013	Sunderland	0	(0)
2011	→ Brentford (loan)	11	(0)
2011	→ Bradford City (loan)	4	(0)
2012	→ Leyton Orient (loan)	11	(0)
2013	→ Portsmouth (loan)	10	(0)
2013	→ York City (loan)	6	(2)
2013–2014	Burton Albion	5	(1)
2014	York City	19	(0)
2016–2017	Kaya		
2018	Davao Aguilas		
2019	Chainat Hornbill	20	(0)
2020	Pahang	11	(1)
2021	UiTM	2	(0)
2021–2022	United City	0	(0)
2022	Ratchaburi Mitr Phol	0	(0)

International career^{‡}
2017–2019	Philippines	10	(1)
- * Club domestic league appearances and goals as of 00:12, 28 August 2021 (UTC) ‡ National team caps and goals as of 17:00, 16 January 2019 (UTC)

Adam Michael Reed (born 8 May 1991), also known as Adam Tull, is a professional footballer who plays as a midfielder. Born in England, he plays for the Philippines national team.

After starting his career with Sunderland, Reed had loan spells with Brentford, Bradford City, Leyton Orient, Portsmouth and York City. He signed for Burton Albion in 2013 and after being released had a second spell with York in 2014.

== Club career ==
Reed was born in Hartlepool, County Durham and is of Filipino descent. He joined Sunderland's youth system at the age of eight, and became a reserve-team regular by 2009. On 21 February 2011, he joined League One club Brentford on a one-month loan deal. He made his first-team debut in his hometown, as on 5 March 2011 he replaced Robbie Simpson 58 minutes into a 3–0 away defeat to Hartlepool United. He made his first start three days later, in a 1–0 home defeat to Brighton & Hove Albion.

Reed signed a one-month loan with League Two club Bradford City on 29 September 2011. He returned to Sunderland at the end of October 2011, having made four appearances for Bradford with injuries also plaguing his stint at the club. On 8 March 2012, Reed joined League One club Leyton Orient on loan for the rest of the 2011–12 season.

On 24 January 2013, he signed on a one-month loan for Portsmouth in League One. On 7 March 2013, he returned to Sunderland after making 10 appearances for Portsmouth. He joined League Two club York City on 26 March 2013 on a one-month loan, making his debut four days later in a 0–0 draw away to Bristol Rovers. He scored his first goal to give York the lead with a 45th-minute goal against Accrington Stanley on 6 April 2013, a match that ended in a 1–1 draw. Reed finished his loan at York with two goals in six appearances.

At the end of 2012–13, Reed was released by Sunderland. On 18 June 2013, Reed signed for League Two club Burton Albion on a one-year contract. Reed rejoined York on 4 January 2014 on a contract until the end of 2013–14 after parting company with Burton. He was released by the club in May 2014.

After an unsuccessful trial with League One Crewe Alexandra Reed joined Northern Premier League Division One North club Darlington 1883 in August 2014. He signed for Northern League Division One club Whitley Bay on 1 November 2014.

In January 2016, Reed signed for United Football League club Stallion, before joining their divisional rivals Kaya in April.

Reed signed for Philippines Football League club Davao Aguilas in January 2018. After the 2018 season, Davao Aguilas folded and released all its players.

In February 2019, Reed signed for Thai League 1 club Chainat Hornbill.

Reed subsequently joined Malaysian Super League team Pahang in January 2020.

== International career ==
In November 2017, Reed was included in the Philippines squad for the 2017 CTFA International Tournament that was held in Taiwan. He received his first cap on 1 December 2017 in a 3–1 win against Laos.

== Career statistics ==
=== Club ===
As of end of 2013–14 season

Appearances and goals by club, season and competition
Club	Season	League			National Cup		League Cup		Other		Total	
Club	Season	Division	Apps	Goals	Apps	Goals	Apps	Goals	Apps	Goals	Apps	Goals
Sunderland	2009–10	Premier League	0	0	0	0	0	0	—		0	0
Sunderland	2010–11	Premier League	0	0	0	0	0	0	—		0	0
Sunderland	2011–12	Premier League	0	0	0	0	0	0	—		0	0
Sunderland	2012–13	Premier League	0	0	0	0	0	0	—		0	0
Sunderland	Total		0	0	0	0	0	0	—		0	0
Brentford (loan)	2010–11	League One	11	0	—		—		1 (Note: Appearance in Football League Trophy)	0	12	0
Bradford City (loan)	2011–12	League Two	4	0	—		—		0	0	4	0
Leyton Orient (loan)	2011–12	League One	11	0	—		—		—		11	0
Portsmouth (loan)	2012–13	League One	10	0	—		—		—		10	0
York City (loan)	2012–13	League Two	6	2	—		—		—		6	2
Burton Albion	2013–14	League Two	5	1	0	0	1	0	1	0	7	1
York City	2013–14	League Two	19	0	—		—		2 (Note: Appearances in League Two play-offs)	0	21	0
Career total			66	3	0	0	1	0	4	0	71	3

=== International ===
As of match played 16 January 2019

Appearances and goals by national team and year
National team	Year	Apps	Goals
Philippines	2017	3	0
Philippines	2018	5	1
Philippines	2019	2	0
Total		10	1

=== International goals ===
As of match played 16 January 2019. Philippines score listed first, score column indicates score after each Reed goal.

International goals by date, venue, cap, opponent, score, result and competition
No.	Date	Venue	Cap	Opponent	Score	Result	Competition	Ref.
1	31 December 2018	Grand Hamad Stadium, Doha, Qatar	8	Vietnam	1–0	2–4	Friendly	

== Honours ==
Brentford

- Football League Trophy runner-up: 2010–11
