= Blair Adams =

English footballer (born 1991)

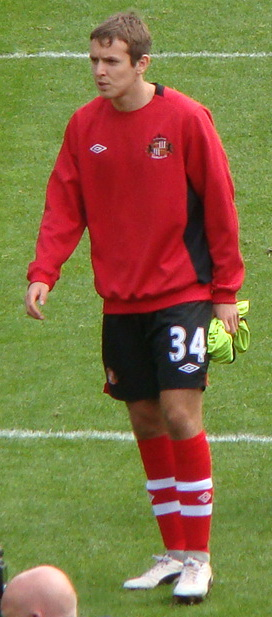
- Adams with Sunderland in 2011

Personal information
- Full name: Blair Vincent Adams
- Date of birth: 8 September 1991 (age 35)
- Place of birth: South Shields, England
- Height: 5 ft 9 in (1.75 m)
- Position: Left back

Team information
- Current team
- Number: 38

Youth career
- –2010: Sunderland

Senior career*
| Years | Team | Apps | (Gls) |
| 2010–2013 | Sunderland | 0 | (0) |
| 2011 | → Brentford (loan) | 7 | (0) |
| 2012 | → Northampton Town (loan) | 22 | (0) |
| 2012–2013 | → Coventry City (loan) | 11 | (0) |
| 2013–2014 | Coventry City | 41 | (0) |
| 2014–2016 | Notts County | 49 | (1) |
| 2015–2016 | → Mansfield Town (loan) | 13 | (0) |
| 2016–2017 | Cambridge United | 4 | (0) |
| 2017 | Hamilton Academical | 5 | (0) |
| 2017–2018 | Hartlepool United | 33 | (1) |
| 2018–2024 | South Shields | 180 | (11) |
| 2021 | → Gateshead (loan) | 1 | (0) |
| 2025 | North Shields | 6 | (0) |
| 2025 | Darlington | 4 | (0) |
| 2025– | North Shields | 25 | (1) |

International career
| 2011 | England U20 | 2 | (0) |
- * Club domestic league appearances and goals as of 00:50, 22 May 2026 (UTC)

Blair Vincent Adams (born 8 September 1991) is an English professional footballer who plays as a left back for North Shields. His professional career dates back to 2010 since which time he has played with teams including Brentford, Northampton Town, Coventry City, Mansfield Town, Cambridge United, and Gateshead. Over his career he has made over 100 appearances in the English Football League and played in more than 300 matches overall.

== Career ==
Adams graduated from Sunderland's academy in summer 2010. He was given the squad number 34 during his first professional season and was the reserves' leading appearance-maker in 2010–11, playing 24 games.

On 8 September 2011, Adams moved to Brentford on loan until 7 December and on 5 October, he scored his first ever professional goal against Charlton Athletic in the Football League Trophy. With seven appearances, Adams return to Sunderland from a loan spell.

On 2 January 2012 Adams moved on loan to Northampton Town. At the end of January, Adams loan spell at Northampton was extended by another month His loan spells was soon extended twice, leading another one until the end of the season

On 17 November 2012, he moved to Coventry City on loan. On the same day, Adams made his debut, setting up a goal for Carl Baker, in a 5–0 win over Hartlepool United. On 8 December 2012, Adams scored an own goal but Coventry went on to win 5–1. This loan was made permanent on 17 January 2013. Two days after making his move permanent, Adams played his first match in a 2–0 win over Oldham Athletic.

Adams and Coventry mutually parted ways at the end of the 2013–14 season, later signing with League One club Notts County.

In October 2015 Adams joined Mansfield Town on a one-month loan. On 17 November 2015, his loan contract has extended until 19 January 2016.

After a spell with Cambridge United, Adams signed for Scottish Premiership club Hamilton Academical in January 2017. He was released by Hamilton at the end of the 2016–17 season.

After a brief period at Hartlepool United Adams was announced as a new signing for his hometown club, South Shields on 27 July 2018. On his 27th birthday, 8 September, he scored a hat-trick in a FA Cup qualifying match against Garforth Town that ended 5–1. Adams signed a new two-year contract in March 2020, with the option of a further year. As of March 2020, he was coaching as part of the club's Futures Academy at Mortimer Community College. On 12 January 2021, Adams joined National League North side Gateshead on an initial 28-day loan. The one-year option on Adams' contract was triggered at the end of the 2021–22 season. He helped South Shields gain promotion to the National League North in 2023, and remained with them for one further season.

In 2025, Adams spent a few weeks with North Shields of the Northern League Division One before signing for National League North club Darlington on 24 March until the end of the season.

== Career statistics ==
As of end of 2025–26 season

Appearances and goals by club, season and competition
| Club | Season | League | | | National cup (Note: Includes FA Cup, Scottish Cup) | | League cup (Note: Includes Football League Cup / EFL Cup, Scottish League Cup) | | Other | | Total | |
| Club | Season | Division | Apps | Goals | Apps | Goals | Apps | Goals | Apps | Goals | Apps | Goals |
|---|---|---|---|---|---|---|---|---|---|---|---|---|
| Sunderland | 2010–11 | Premier League | 0 | 0 | 0 | 0 | 0 | 0 | — | | 0 | 0 |
| Sunderland | 2011–12 | Premier League | 0 | 0 | 0 | 0 | 0 | 0 | — | | 0 | 0 |
| Sunderland | 2012–13 | Premier League | 0 | 0 | 0 | 0 | 0 | 0 | — | | 0 | 0 |
| Sunderland | Total | | 0 | 0 | 0 | 0 | 0 | 0 | 0 | 0 | 0 | 0 |
| Brentford (loan) | 2011–12 | League One | 7 | 0 | 1 | 0 | 0 | 0 | 1 (Note: Appearance(s) in the Football League Trophy) | 1 | 9 | 1 |
| Northampton Town (loan) | 2011–12 | League Two | 22 | 0 | 0 | 0 | 0 | 0 | 0 | 0 | 22 | 0 |
| Coventry City (loan) | 2012–13 | League One | 11 | 0 | 2 | 0 | 0 | 0 | 2 | 0 | 15 | 0 |
| Coventry City | 2012–13 | League One | 5 | 0 | 0 | 0 | 0 | 0 | 1 | 0 | 6 | 0 |
| Coventry City | 2013–14 | League One | 36 | 0 | 5 | 0 | 1 | 0 | 1 | 0 | 43 | 0 |
| Coventry City | Total | | 41 | 0 | 5 | 0 | 1 | 0 | 2 | 0 | 49 | 0 |
| Notts County | 2014–15 | League One | 34 | 1 | 2 | 0 | 1 | 0 | 3 | 0 | 40 | 1 |
| Notts County | 2015–16 | League Two | 15 | 0 | 0 | 0 | 0 | 0 | 0 | 0 | 15 | 0 |
| Notts County | Total | | 49 | 1 | 2 | 0 | 1 | 0 | 3 | 0 | 55 | 1 |
| Mansfield Town (loan) | 2015–16 | League Two | 13 | 0 | 2 | 0 | 0 | 0 | 0 | 0 | 15 | 0 |
| Cambridge United | 2016–17 | League Two | 6 | 0 | 2 | 0 | 2 | 0 | 2 (Note: Appearance(s) in the EFL Trophy) | 0 | 12 | 0 |
| Hamilton Academical | 2016–17 | Scottish Premiership | 5 | 0 | 2 | 0 | 0 | 0 | — | | 7 | 0 |
| Hartlepool United | 2017–18 | National League | 33 | 1 | 2 | 0 | — | | 1 | 0 | 36 | 1 |
| South Shields | 2018–19 | NPL Premier Division | 39 | 2 | 2 | 3 | — | | 5 | 0 | 46 | 5 |
| South Shields | 2019–20 | NPL Premier Division | 23 | 0 | 2 | 0 | — | | 6 | 1 | 31 | 1 |
| South Shields | 2020–21 | NPL Premier Division | 6 | 0 | 5 | 0 | — | | 2 (Note: Appearance(s) in FA Trophy) | 0 | 13 | 0 |
| South Shields | 2021–22 | NPL Premier Division | 37 | 5 | 1 | 1 | — | | 3 (Note: One appearance in FA Trophy, one in NPL Premier Division play-offs, one in Durham Senior Cup) | 0 | 41 | 6 |
| South Shields | 2022–23 | NPL Premier Division | 36 | 3 | 4 | 0 | — | | 1 | 0 | 41 | 3 |
| South Shields | 2023–24 | National League North | 39 | 1 | 2 | 0 | — | | 1 | 0 | 42 | 1 |
| South Shields | Total | | 180 | 11 | 16 | 4 | — | | 18 | 1 | 214 | 16 |
| Gateshead (loan) | 2020–21 | National League North | 1 | 0 | — | | — | | — | | 1 | 0 |
| North Shields | 2024–25 | Northern League Division One | 6 | 0 | — | | — | | — | | 6 | 0 |
| Darlington | 2024–25 | National League North | 4 | 0 | — | | — | | — | | 4 | 0 |
| North Shields | 2025–26 | Northern League Division One | 25 | 1 | 1 | 0 | — | | 6 | 0 | 32 | 1 |
| Career total | | | 403 | 14 | 34 | 4 | 4 | 0 | 35 | 2 | 477 | 20 |

== Honours ==
South Shields

- Northern Premier League: 2022–23
