= Kieran Richardson =

English footballer (born 1984)

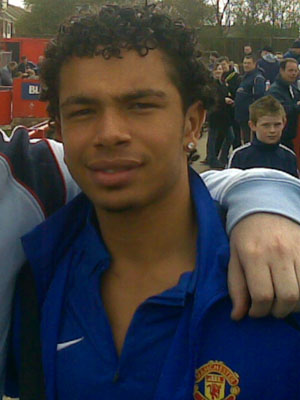
- Richardson in 2007

Personal information
- Full name: Kieran Edward Richardson
- Date of birth: 21 October 1984 (age 42)
- Place of birth: Greenwich, England
- Height: 1.73 m (5 ft 8 in)
- Positions: Winger; left-back; central midfielder

Youth career
- –2001: West Ham United
- 2001–2002: Manchester United

Senior career*
Years	Team	Apps	(Gls)
2002–2007	Manchester United	41	(2)
2005	→ West Bromwich Albion (loan)	12	(3)
2007–2012	Sunderland	134	(14)
2012–2014	Fulham	45	(5)
2014–2016	Aston Villa	33	(0)
2016–2017	Cardiff City	6	(0)
Total		271	(24)

International career
2002	England U18	1	(0)
2005–2007	England U21	12	(1)
2005–2006	England	8	(2)
- * Club domestic league appearances and goals

Kieran Edward Richardson (born 21 October 1984) is an English former professional footballer who played as a winger, left-back, or central midfielder.

Richardson began his career as a trainee at West Ham United, going on to play senior football at Manchester United, Sunderland, Fulham, Aston Villa and Cardiff City. He was capped eight times for England, scoring twice.

== Club career ==
=== Early career ===
Richardson was born in Greenwich, London and was schooled at the private and non-selective Riverston School in Lee, London. Growing up he would watch Arsenal with his father Clyde who was a season ticket holder. He began playing football at Parkwood Primary School and his talent was very apparent at this young age, he was made captain of his school team and was invited to train with Arsenal.

He then moved to West Ham United where he would begin training professionally. However, before he made his debut for the Londoners, he was signed by Manchester United in 2001.

=== Manchester United ===
During his first season at Manchester United, Richardson established his place as a regular on United's reserve team. He was given squad number 42 for the first team, but he failed to make his debut with them.

He made his first appearance for Manchester United on 23 October 2002 when coming on as a late substitute in a match against Olympiacos in the UEFA Champions League. He then scored his first goal for United in the League Cup on 5 November 2002 against Leicester City. Richardson enjoyed his first breakthrough during the 2002–03 season, appearing nine times and scoring a goal for the first team. He also played a role in Manchester United's youth team's win of the 2003 FA Youth Cup.

At the start of 2003–04, he was given squad number 23 and only appeared three times, all of them in League Cup and FA Cup.

During 2004–05, he started to become more involved with the first team. He had already made nine appearances and scored one goal during the first half of the season. However, during the January transfer window, Alex Ferguson decided to loan him out in order for him to gain more first team experience. Richardson was linked with a loan move to Norwich City, but Ferguson said there was no chance as other players had gone on loan. Former Manchester United captain Bryan Robson, then manager of West Bromwich Albion, enquired about loaning Richardson and the deal was done straight away. Under Robson, Richardson made an instant impact on West Brom's quest to escape relegation. He was a regular in West Brom's first eleven, playing in central midfield. He scored three goals from 12 appearances as West Bromwich successfully avoided relegation, despite starting the final day of the season on the bottom of the table.

At the start of 2005–06, Richardson declined a further loan spell at West Brom in an attempt to win a regular place at Old Trafford. He made his break in Manchester United's first eleven in September 2005, when he appeared as an emergency left back in place of the injured Gabriel Heinze. He soon returned to midfield, however, where he made several good performances. In October 2005, Richardson celebrated his 21st birthday by signing a new four-year contract with United. He went on to appear 36 times and score six goals that season.

In 2006–07, Richardson's chances to establish himself in the first team were limited, mainly playing in the League Cup and the FA Cup. However, Richardson felt Alex Ferguson's wrath, as the youngster shouldered some of the blame for United's below-par performance against Crewe Alexandra in the League Cup. Ferguson publicly declared that Richardson and others would benefit from spending some time in United's reserve team. He scored one of United's goals in the 4–1 FA Cup semi-final win over Watford, that put them into the final at the new Wembley Stadium.

=== Sunderland ===
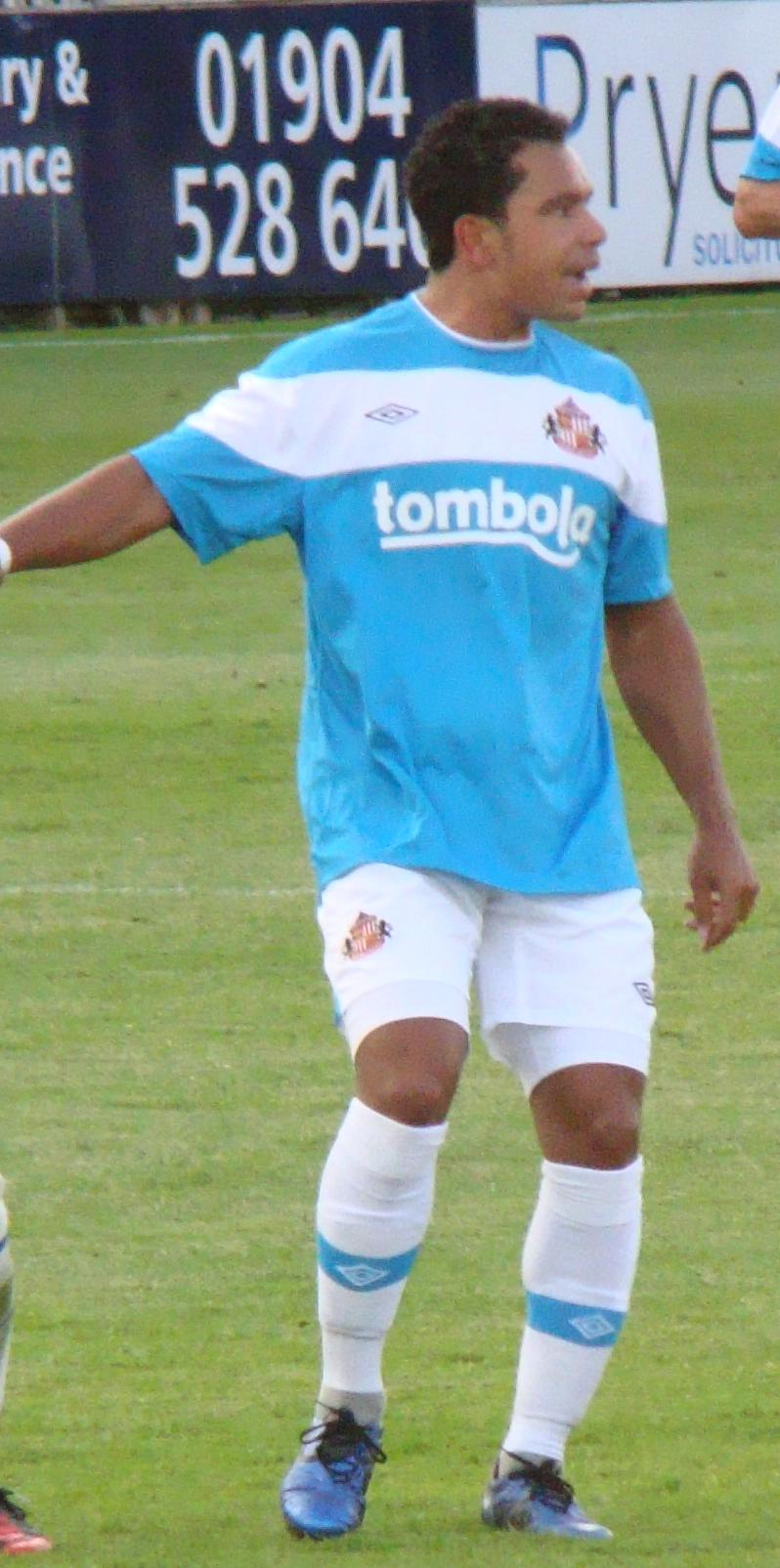
Richardson playing for Sunderland in 2011

On 16 July 2007, Richardson joined Sunderland for an undisclosed fee, reported to be in the region of £5.5 million. He signed a four-year contract with Sunderland, under the management of his former United captain Roy Keane. After an indifferent start, it was discovered that he had a stress fracture of the spine. This led to him being out of action for almost four months. He scored his first goal for Sunderland on 29 December 2007 against Bolton Wanderers. Richardson scored two goals in the 2–0 win against Portsmouth at the Stadium of Light on 13 January 2008, also striking the bar to miss out on his hat-trick. He then suffered a hamstring injury in training; this injury recurred in Sunderland's 3–0 defeat to Liverpool at Anfield.

On 23 August 2008, Richardson scored against Tottenham Hotspur in the 56th minute, in a 2–1 win at White Hart Lane. Richardson took a free kick that hit the post three times at Fulham on 18 October, and later had another free kick disallowed as Pascal Chimbonda was adjudged to be pushing in the wall. On 25 October 2008, Richardson scored the winning goal in the Tyne–Wear derby, with a free kick. Richardson attracted interest from Bolton Wanderers in the 2009 January transfer window, but manager Ricky Sbragia insisted that he was not for sale.

Richardson scored his first goal of 2009–10 with an equaliser against West Ham United, which ended 2–2. Richardson was used in several positions throughout the season, whilst predominantly featuring in central midfield he also played at left back – his performances there led to many touting him as a surprise World Cup inclusion.

In the buildup to 2010–11, Richardson committed his future to the club by signing a new three-year contract. Soon after, he became first-choice left back at the club citing Brazilian full-back Maicon as inspiration for taking up his new position, saying: "I watched the World Cup and saw the way guys like Maicon were bombing forward – and I thought "I can do that". He opened his scoring account for the season on 22 January away to Blackpool scoring two goals in the first half. After deploying him in an attacking role, Sunderland manager Steve Bruce hailed Richardson's versatility, saying: "I must have asked him to play in five or six positions this season and certainly in that position he enjoys it, it's something he revels in". He then added: "He was the outstanding player on the pitch. In the first half he was brilliant, his pace was superb." Richardson scored directly from a free kick in Sunderland's next match, a 4–2 home defeat to Chelsea. Richardson made his 100th Premier League appearance for Sunderland at home to Tottenham Hotspur on 12 February, assisting Asamoah Gyan's opener in a 2–1 defeat.

Richardson's first goal of 2011–12 came in a 2–1 defeat at Norwich. Richardson was on target again in a defeat at Wolves under caretaker manager Eric Black, following Steve Bruce's departure. In this match against Wolves on 4 December 2011, Richardson scored the opening goal, a long range shot from the left, and celebrated by removing his shirt, revealing a T-shirt with the slogan "I belong to Jesus". He was booked for removing his shirt. Sunderland went on to lose the match 2–1.Under new manager Martin O'Neill, Richardson began to make impressive progress after being shifted into his preferred left wing position, making another contribution in his team's 3–2 victory away to Queens Park Rangers on 21 December 2011 after setting up two goals from corner kicks. On 18 February 2012, he scored his first FA Cup goal for the club against Arsenal at the Stadium of Light in the fifth round, in which he scored the first goal in Sunderland's 2–0 win.

=== Fulham ===
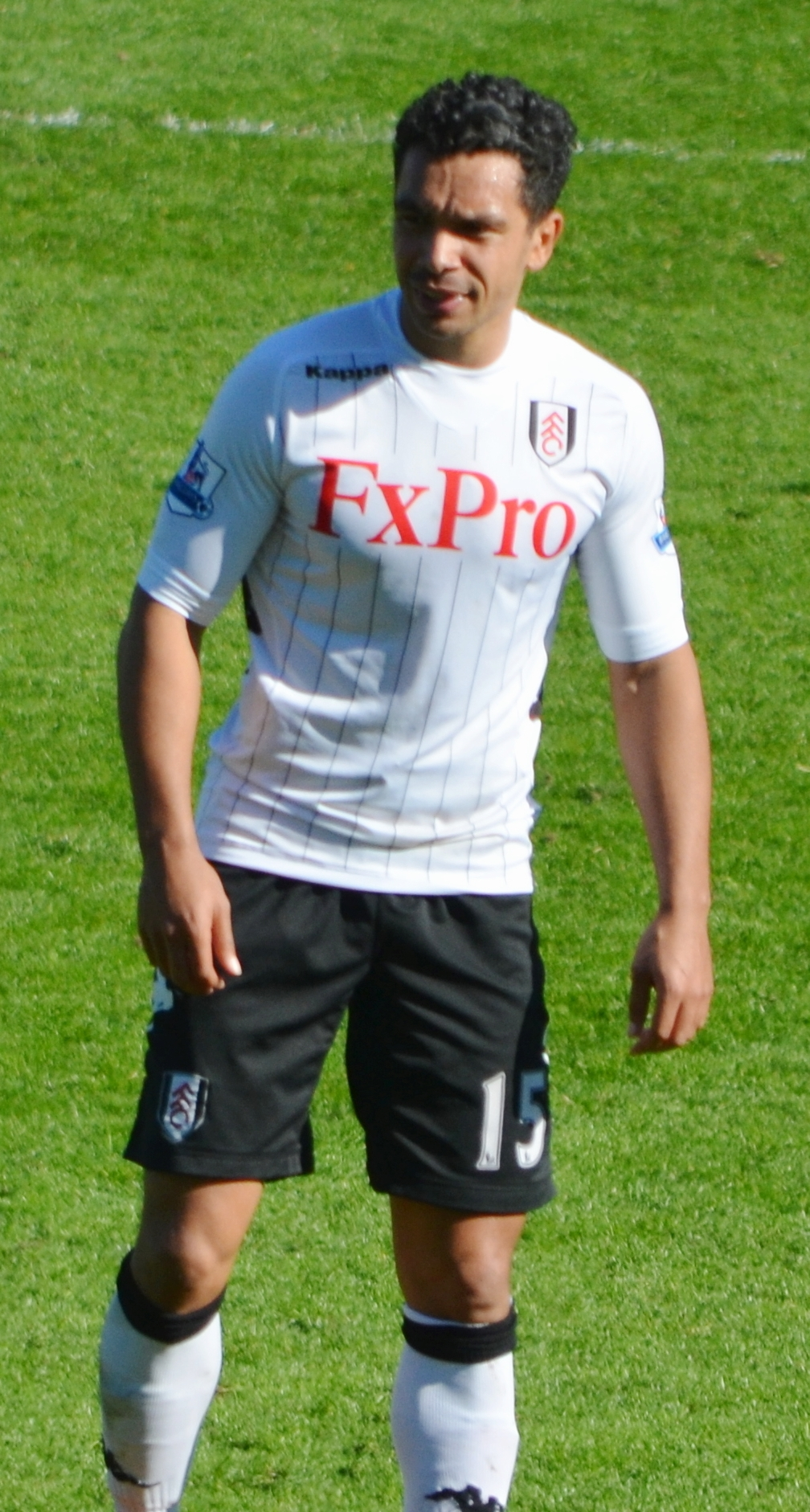
Richardson playing for Fulham in 2013

On 31 August 2012, Richardson signed for Fulham from Sunderland for an undisclosed fee, reported to be approximately £2 million. He scored his first goal for the club in a 2–2 draw against Southampton on 7 October.

=== Aston Villa ===
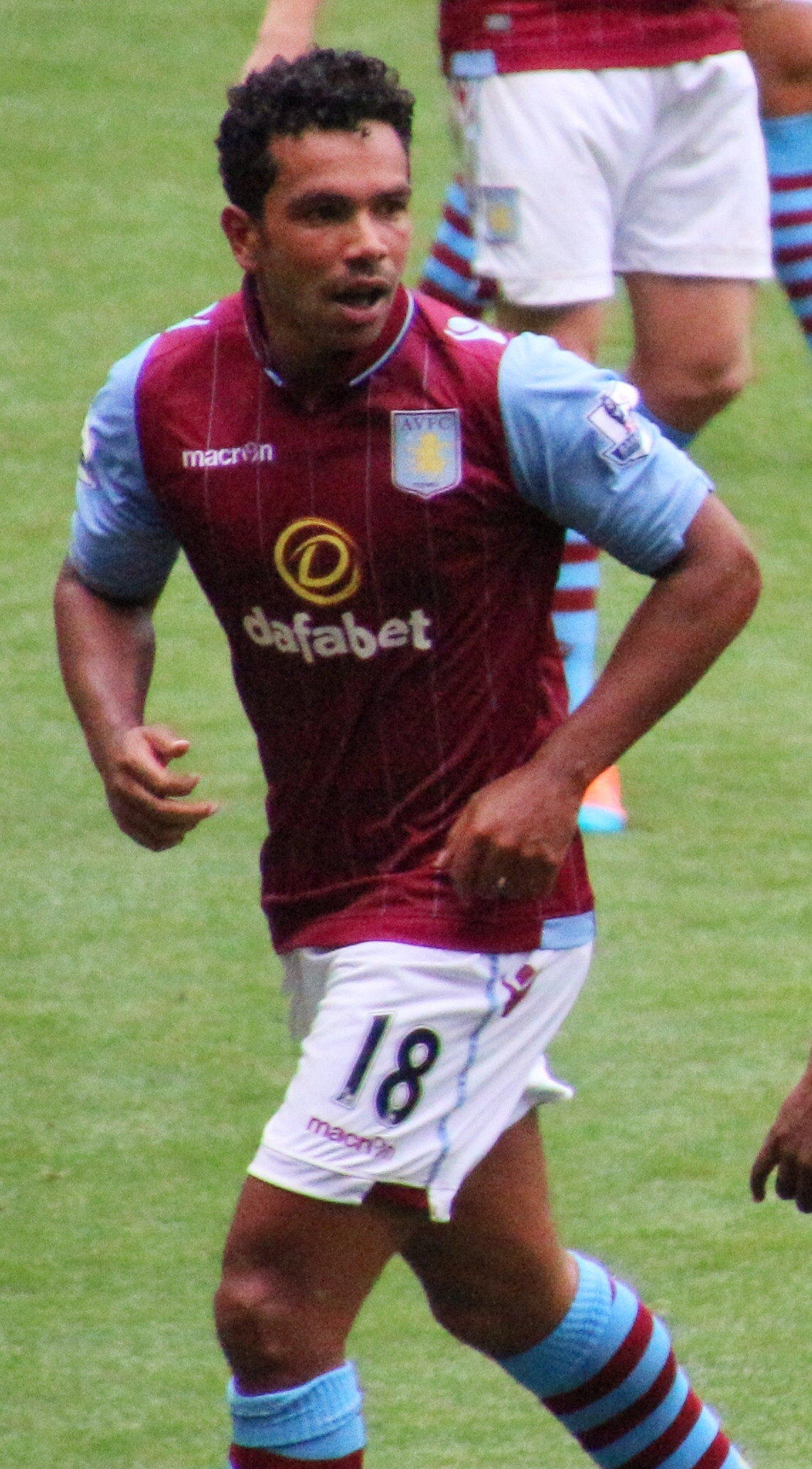
Richardson playing for Aston Villa in 2014

On 11 July 2014, Richardson signed for Aston Villa on a two-year contract and was reunited with his former manager at Sunderland, Roy Keane, who was Villa's assistant manager at the time. He made his debut in a 1–0 victory against Stoke. Richardson got his first assist in a 2–1 victory against Hull City at Villa Park, sliding in a low cross which Andreas Weimann slotted home from 10 yards. Richardson received a straight red card on 13 December 2014 for a late challenge on Stéphane Sessègnon during a 1–0 away defeat to West Brom.

After Villa's relegation from the Premier League, on 10 June 2016, it was announced that Richardson would leave Villa on the expiry of his contract.

=== Later career ===
On 12 October 2016, Richardson joined Championship club Cardiff City on a contract until January 2017. On 29 December 2016, Richardson was released from his contract.

On 12 April 2017, Richardson trialled at La Liga club Granada with a view to a contract until the end of the 2016–17 season.

== International career ==
During his stay at West Brom, he won his first cap for the England under-21 team on 8 February 2005 in a friendly match against the Netherlands. After a series of convincing performances for West Brom, he won a late call-up for England's trip to the United States at the end of 2004–05. He started the match against the United States and scored twice on his England debut, including one directly from a free kick. He earned praise from England manager Sven-Göran Eriksson, who described Richardson's debut as "fantastic". He also appeared as a substitute on England's second match in the United States against Colombia.

After earning senior caps, Richardson also returned to the under-21 squad, playing in both legs of the 2006 UEFA European Under-21 Championship qualification play-off against France, which they lost 3–2 on aggregate. The decisive goal came in the 85th minute of the second leg, when Richardson brought down Lassana Diarra in the box and the resulting penalty was converted.

He then made two further substitute appearances during England's World Cup qualifiers against Wales in Cardiff and Austria at Old Trafford. The latter was his home England debut. However, he was not selected by Sven-Göran Eriksson in England's 2006 World Cup squad.

In 2006–07, he continued to be selected by newly-appointed England manager Steve McClaren and made several substitute appearances. He went on to make further appearances for the England U21 squad, for whom he was eligible to play until the end of the 2007 UEFA European Under-21 Championship, where he made three appearances. However, he neither started nor scored for the England senior team after his debut.

== Personal life ==
Richardson is married to Natalie with whom he has two daughters, and who was the catalyst for him becoming a born again Christian. In 2007, he said: "I just want to praise Jesus Christ and go to heaven. That's all I care about".

== Career statistics ==
=== Club ===
Appearances and goals by club, season and competition
Club	Season	League			FA Cup		League Cup		Europe		Other		Total	
Club	Season	Division	Apps	Goals	Apps	Goals	Apps	Goals	Apps	Goals	Apps	Goals	Apps	Goals
Manchester United	2002–03	Premier League	2	0	1	0	1	1	5 (Note: Appearances in UEFA Champions League)	0	—		9	1
Manchester United	2003–04	Premier League	0	0	1	0	2	0	0	0	0	0	3	0
Manchester United	2004–05	Premier League	2	0	1	0	3	1	2	0	1 (Note: Appearance in FA Community Shield)	0	9	1
Manchester United	2005–06	Premier League	22	1	4	3	5	1	5	1	—		36	6
Manchester United	2006–07	Premier League	15	1	3	1	2	0	4	1	—		24	3
Manchester United	Total		41	2	10	4	13	3	16	2	1	0	81	11
West Bromwich Albion (loan)	2004–05	Premier League	12	3	—		—		—		—		12	3
Sunderland	2007–08	Premier League	17	3	1	0	0	0	—		—		18	3
Sunderland	2008–09	Premier League	32	4	1	0	2	0	—		—		35	4
Sunderland	2009–10	Premier League	29	1	1	0	2	0	—		—		32	1
Sunderland	2010–11	Premier League	26	4	1	0	2	0	—		—		29	4
Sunderland	2011–12	Premier League	29	2	4	1	1	0	—		—		34	3
Sunderland	2012–13	Premier League	1	0	—		0	0	—		—		1	0
Sunderland	Total		134	14	8	1	7	0	—		—		149	15
Fulham	2012–13	Premier League	14	1	2	1	—		—		—		16	2
Fulham	2013–14	Premier League	31	4	1	0	0	0	—		—		32	4
Fulham	Total		45	5	3	1	0	0	—		—		48	6
Aston Villa	2014–15	Premier League	22	0	3	0	1	0	—		—		26	0
Aston Villa	2015–16	Premier League	11	0	2	0	2	0	—		—		15	0
Aston Villa	Total		33	0	5	0	3	0	—		—		41	0
Cardiff City	2016–17	Championship	6	0	—		—		—		—		6	0
Career total			271	24	26	6	23	3	16	2	1	0	337	35

=== International ===
Appearances and goals by national team and year
National team	Year	Apps	Goals
England	2005	4	2
England	2006	4	0
Total		8	2

Scores and results list England's goal tally first, score column indicates score after each Richardson goal.

List of international goals scored by Kieran Richardson
No.	Date	Venue	Cap	Opponent	Score	Result	Competition	Ref.
1	28 May 2005	Soldier Field, Chicago, United States	1	United States	1–0	2–1	Friendly	
2	28 May 2005	Soldier Field, Chicago, United States	1	United States	2–0	2–1	Friendly	

== Honours ==
Manchester United Youth

- FA Youth Cup: 2002–03

Manchester United

- Premier League: 2006–07
- Football League Cup: 2005–06
- FA Community Shield: 2003

Aston Villa

- FA Cup runner-up: 2014–15
