= Ryan Noble =

English footballer

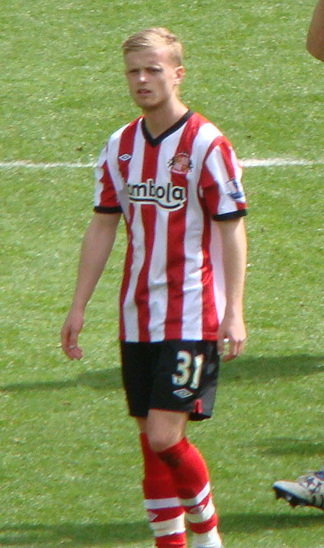
- Noble playing for Sunderland

Personal information
- Full name: Ryan Andrew Noble
- Date of birth: 11 June 1991 (age 35)
- Place of birth: Sunderland, England
- Height: 1.83 m (6 ft 0 in)
- Position: Striker

Youth career
- 2007–2009: Sunderland

Senior career*
Years	Team	Apps	(Gls)
2009–2013	Sunderland	5	(0)
2010	→ Watford (loan)	0	(0)
2010	→ Derby County (loan)	1	(0)
2012	→ Derby County (loan)	2	(0)
2012	→ Hartlepool United (loan)	9	(2)
2012	→ Hartlepool United (loan)	10	(1)
2013–2014	Burnley	1	(0)
2014	Gateshead	9	(1)
2014	Darlington 1883	4	(0)
2014–2015	Durham City	32	(18)
2015	Sunderland R.C.A.	0	(0)
2015	South Shields	2	(0)
2015–2016	Seaham Red Star	10	(5)
2016	Esh Winning	1	(0)
2016	Whitley Bay	0	(0)
2016	Easington Colliery	0	(0)
2016–2017	Bishop Auckland		
2018	Newton Aycliffe	3	(0)
2018–2019	Seaham Red Star	5	(0)
2019	Jarrow	3	(1)
2019–2020	Billingham Synthonia	4	(0)

International career
2008	England U17	2	(0)
2010	England U19	6	(1)
- * Club domestic league appearances and goals as of 29 August 2020

Ryan Andrew Noble (11 June 1991) is an English former footballer. Noble has played as a striker for Sunderland, Watford, Derby County, Hartlepool United, Burnley and Gateshead.

== Club career ==
=== Sunderland ===
A product of the club's youth academy, Noble made his first professional appearance for Sunderland on 2 January 2010, coming on as a substitute for Darren Bent in a 3–0 FA Cup victory against Barrow at the Stadium of Light. On his return from a six-month lay off, he returned to goalscoring ways by scoring seven goals in his first five games back for Sunderland Reserves. He was rewarded for his fine form with his league debut for the first team, coming from the bench as Sunderland lost against Everton on 26 February 2011. Noble's next appearance also came as a substitute, in Sunderland's 2–0 defeat at Birmingham City on 16 April. An injury crisis meant that Noble was in line to make his first start for Sunderland against Fulham. However, Noble himself picked up an injury during a youth team game, ruling him out of the game and leaving the team with no fit strikers.

On 16 November 2011, Noble bagged a reserve team hat-trick during a 3–0 win against local rivals Newcastle United at the Stadium of Light. This prompted a return to first-team action as a substitute in the 0–0 draw with Fulham the following Saturday, however he was subsequently omitted from the squad altogether for the next match versus Wigan Athletic despite Sunderland continuing to struggle for goals. On 29 November, Noble returned to reserve team action, scoring a six-minute hat-trick as Sunderland thrashed Scunthorpe 7–1. Sunderland manager Steve Bruce was sacked two days later, and replaced by Martin O'Neill. He then scored 4 goals against Manchester United in a reserve match on 8 December 2011.

==== Watford (loan) ====
On 25 March 2010, Noble joined Watford on loan until the end of the 2009–10 season. He failed to make a single first-team appearance for the club.

==== Derby County (loan) ====
Noble was expected to crack the first team in the coming season, but wasn't assigned a first team squad number, leading to speculation he may be loaned out during the season. He eventually joined Championship side Derby County on an emergency loan deal. He made one appearance, as substitute, before a back injury ruled him out of contention and he returned to Sunderland on 25 October 2010.

On 18 January 2012, Noble returned to Derby County for another month-long loan spell. Noble made two appearances during his second loan spell at the club, returning to Sunderland on 14 February 2012.

==== Hartlepool United (loan) ====
On 20 March 2012, Noble went on loan to Hartlepool United until the end of the season. On 24 March 2012, Noble scored his first goal for Hartlepool against Yeovil at Huish Park. He also scored in a match against Leyton Orient.

==== Return to Sunderland ====
Noble was selected in Sunderland's squad that travelled to South Korea for the pre-season 2012 Peace Cup. Coming on as a substitute in Sunderland's third place play-off with FC Groningen, Noble assisted Fraizer Campbell's 89th-minute equaliser, and then scored a brilliant solo goal to give the Black Cats a 3–2 win in the last minute. Was released at the end of the 2012/13 season.

=== Burnley ===
On 19 July 2013, he signed a short-term contract with Burnley. His debut for the Clarets came on 17 August 2013, in a 2–0 home win over Yeovil Town, replacing Danny Ings as a substitute. His second and final appearance came in a 2–0 defeat in the Football League Cup to West Ham United.

=== Gateshead ===
On 13 January 2014, Noble signed for Conference Premier side Gateshead on a six-month deal after the expiry of his Burnley contract. He made his debut the following day in a goalless draw against Aldershot Town. He scored his first Gateshead goal on 22 March 2014 in a 3–1 win over Lincoln City. Noble was released at the end of the 2013–14 season.

=== Durham City ===
At the Start of 2014–15 season Noble signed for Durham City, becoming a fans favourite with his goal scoring record.

=== Sunderland RCA ===
In the summer of 2015 Noble signed for Sunderland RCA, however he was transferred to South Shields shortly afterwards.

=== South Shields ===
Noble signed from RCA on 4 September 2015 alongside childhood hero Julio Arca. However, he was transfer listed shortly after joining South Shields and joined Seaham Red Star in November 2015.

=== Seaham Red Star ===
Noble made his Seaham debut against Dunston UTS, on 7 November, in a 3–1 defeat with Noble missing a penalty.

== International career ==
Noble played 6 times for the England U19 football team. He scored his first and only U19 goal in 2010, against Bosnia.

== Career statistics ==
As of 26 April 2014

Club	Season	League			FA Cup		League Cup		Other		Total	
Club	Season	Division	Apps	Goals	Apps	Goals	Apps	Goals	Apps	Goals	Apps	Goals
Sunderland	2009–10	Premier League	0	0	1	0	0	0	—		1	0
Sunderland	2010–11	Premier League	3	0	0	0	0	0	—		3	0
Sunderland	2011–12	Premier League	2	0	0	0	0	0	—		2	0
Sunderland	2012–13	Premier League	0	0	0	0	0	0	—		0	0
Sunderland	Total		5	0	1	0	0	0	—		6	0
Watford (loan)	2009–10	Championship	0	0	0	0	0	0	—		0	0
Derby County (loan)	2010–11	Championship	1	0	0	0	0	0	—		1	0
Derby County (loan)	2011–12	Championship	2	0	0	0	0	0	—		2	0
Derby County (loan)	Total		3	0	0	0	0	0	—		3	0
Hartlepool United (loan)	2011–12	League One	9	2	0	0	0	0	0	0	9	2
Hartlepool United (loan)	2012–13	League One	10	1	1	0	0	0	1 (Note: Appearance(s) in Football League Trophy)	0	12	1
Hartlepool United (loan)	Total		19	3	1	0	0	0	1	0	21	3
Burnley	2013–14	Championship	1	0	0	0	1	0	—		2	0
Gateshead	2013–14	Conference Premier	9	1	—		—		—		9	1
Career totals			37	4	2	0	1	0	1	0	41	4
