= John Egan (footballer, born 1992) =

Irish footballer (born 1992)

- Egan in 2026

Personal information
- Full name: John Patrick Egan
- Date of birth: 20 October 1992 (age 34)
- Place of birth: Cork, Ireland
- Height: 1.85 m (6 ft 1 in)
- Position: Centre-back

Team information
- Current team: Hull City
- Number: 15

Youth career
- 2000–2009: Greenwood
- 2009–2011: Sunderland

Senior career*
Years	Team	Apps	(Gls)
2011–2014	Sunderland	0	(0)
2012	→ Crystal Palace (loan)	1	(0)
2012	→ Sheffield United (loan)	1	(0)
2012	→ Bradford City (loan)	4	(0)
2014	→ Southend United (loan)	13	(1)
2014–2016	Gillingham	81	(10)
2016–2018	Brentford	67	(6)
2018–2024	Sheffield United	208	(7)
2024–2025	Burnley	7	(0)
2025–	Hull City	65	(3)

International career^{‡}
	Republic of Ireland U17	2	(0)
2010–2011	Republic of Ireland U19	10	(0)
2012–2014	Republic of Ireland U21	6	(0)
2017–	Republic of Ireland	41	(3)
- * Club domestic league appearances and goals as of 08:22, 2 November 2026 (UTC) ‡ National team caps and goals as of 23:20, 17 November 2026 (UTC)

John Patrick Egan (born 20 October 1992) is an Irish professional footballer who plays as a centre-back for Premier League club Hull City and the Republic of Ireland national team.

Beginning his career at Sunderland, he had loan spells with Crystal Palace, Sheffield United, Bradford City and Southend United, but was released by the Wearside club without making an appearance for the first team. In July 2014, he joined Gillingham, and was named Player of the Year in his first season, and voted in the League One PFA Team of the Year in his second. In July 2016, he joined Brentford, where he was captain of the club in his second season. In July 2018, he rejoined Sheffield United and was part of the team that got promoted to the Premier League.

Internationally, Egan has represented the Republic of Ireland at under-17, under-19 and under-21 level. He made his debut for the senior side in March 2017.

== Early and personal life ==
Born in Cork, Egan started his career with Greenwood FC in Togher. His father John Egan respresented Kerry in Gaelic football, and his mother, Mary Egan, was a football player and has a League of Ireland medal under her belt. He played hurling and Gaelic football for Bishopstown.

== Club career ==
=== Early career ===
Egan was loaned by Sunderland to Crystal Palace in January 2012. Egan made his professional debut for Palace in the FA Cup third round playing the full 90 minutes in their 1–0 loss to Derby County. In March 2012, Egan joined Football League One side Sheffield United on a month's loan to ease a defensive crisis, making his début for the Blades that evening in a defeat at Walsall.

In July 2012, Egan was called up by Martin O'Neill for Sunderland's pre-season tour to South Korea to take part in the Peace Cup. He came on as a substitute for the injured Wes Brown in the 3rd place play-off against FC Groningen of the Netherlands, playing 50 minutes of the 3–2 victory. After a solid pre-season, he was praised by Martin O'Neill and handed the number forty-two jersey for the season. At the start of November 2012 after being around the first team Egan signed a three-month loan deal with Bradford City to get games under his belt. He made his début for Bradford on 6 November in a 0–0 draw at home to Chesterfield. His loan was cut short two weeks later after suffering a broken leg, returning having played four games for the Bantams. This injury ruled him out for a year but during his rehab, Egan agreed to a one-year contract extension with Sunderland in March 2013.

On 27 February 2014, Egan joined League Two side Southend United on an emergency loan. His first goal came on 11 March 2014, in a 2–2 draw against Scunthorpe United, where he scored a "spectacular long-distance effort". He later went on to win Southend's 'Goal of the Season' award and the strike was a sensation on YouTube gaining over 35,000 views. On 28 March 2014, Egan extended his loan stay with the Blues until the end of the 2013–14 season.

=== Gillingham ===
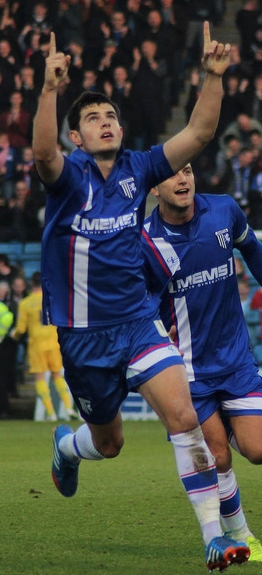
Egan with Gillingham in 2014

On 3 July 2014, amid interest from several clubs from League One and the Championship, Egan signed a two-year deal with Gillingham following his release from Sunderland. Egan enjoyed a fantastic debut season with Gillingham, playing 52 times and scoring 5 goals. He also won the main Player of the Year and Away Player of the Year awards for the club to cap off a good year after finishing 12th in League One. In April 2016, Egan was named in the League One PFA Team of the Year for his performances over the 2015–16 season.

=== Brentford ===
Egan rejected the offer a new contract by Gillingham at the conclusion of the 2015–16 season and joined Championship club Brentford. He scored his first goals for Brentford when he scored twice in a 2–0 win over Ipswich Town on 16 August 2016. In December 2016 the Professional Football Compensation Committee ruled that Brentford should pay Gillingham an initial net compensation fee of £400,000, an additional £25,000 for every 20 games that he plays for Brentford, up to 80 games, as well as a 20% sell-on fee and a fee of £75,000 in the event that Brentford are promoted to the Premier League within the period of the player's three-year contract.

After the sale of captain Harlee Dean in August 2017 to Birmingham City, Egan was appointed as the new captain of Brentford. During the 2017–18 season, Egan impressed as Brentford kept 15 clean sheets as they finished 9th in the EFL Championship.

=== Sheffield United ===
Egan re-joined former loan club Sheffield United on 19 July 2018 on a four-year contract for an undisclosed club-record fee. In his first season with the team, he helped them gain promotion to the Premier League. On 21 August 2020 he signed a new four-year contract, keeping him at the club until 2024. Egan departed the club upon the expiry of his contract.

=== Burnley ===
In September 2024, Egan signed for EFL Championship side Burnley on a free transfer on a one-year deal.

=== Hull City ===
On 3 February 2025, Egan signed an eighteen-month contract with EFL Championship side Hull City for an undisclosed fee. He made his Hull City debut on 12 February against his former team in a 2–0 defeat. He scored his first goal for the club when he netted the equaliser late in extra-time on 13 September, in the 2–2 away draw against Swansea City.

On 2 January 2026, Egan triggered an appearance-related clause in his contract that will see him stay at Hull until the summer of 2027.

== International career ==
On 28 March 2017, Egan made his senior international debut, starting in a friendly against Iceland at the Aviva Stadium. He captained his country for the first time in September 2019 in a 3–1 win against Bulgaria at the Aviva Stadium. On 1 September 2021, he was named FAI Senior International Player of the Year for 2020, the same day that he scored his first senior international goal, in a 2–1 loss away to Portugal in a 2022 World Cup qualifier.

== Career statistics ==
=== Club ===
As of 27 September 2026

Appearances and goals by club, season and competition
Club	Season	Division	League		FA Cup		League Cup		Other		Total	
Club	Season	Division	Apps	Goals	Apps	Goals	Apps	Goals	Apps	Goals	Apps	Goals
Sunderland	2011–12	Premier League	0	0	—		0	0	—		0	0
Sunderland	2012–13	Premier League	0	0	0	0	0	0	—		0	0
Sunderland	Total		0	0	0	0	0	0	0	0	0	0
Crystal Palace (loan)	2011–12	Championship	1	0	1	0	—		—		2	0
Sheffield United (loan)	2011–12	League One	1	0	—		—		—		1	0
Bradford City (loan)	2012–13	League Two	4	0	—		—		—		4	0
Southend United (loan)	2013–14	League Two	13	1	—		—		2 (Note: Appearances in League Two play-offs)	0	15	1
Gillingham	2014–15	League One	45	4	1	0	2	0	4 (Note: Appearance(s) in EFL Trophy)	1	52	5
Gillingham	2015–16	League One	36	6	1	0	2	0	1	0	40	6
Gillingham	Total		81	10	2	0	4	0	5	1	92	11
Brentford	2016–17	Championship	34	4	2	0	1	0	—		37	4
Brentford	2017–18	Championship	33	2	0	0	1	1	—		34	3
Brentford	Total		67	6	2	0	2	1	—		71	7
Sheffield United	2018–19	Championship	44	1	0	0	1	0	—		45	1
Sheffield United	2019–20	Premier League	36	2	2	0	0	0	—		38	2
Sheffield United	2020–21	Premier League	31	0	3	0	0	0	—		34	0
Sheffield United	2021–22	Championship	46	2	0	0	0	0	2 (Note: Appearances in Championship play-offs)	0	48	2
Sheffield United	2022–23	Championship	45	2	5	1	1	0	—		51	3
Sheffield United	2023–24	Premier League	6	0	0	0	1	0	—		7	0
Sheffield United	Total		208	7	10	1	3	0	2	0	223	8
Burnley	2024–25	Championship	7	0	1	0	—		—		8	0
Hull City	2024–25	Championship	11	0	0	0	—		—		11	0
Hull City	2025–26	Championship	42	3	2	0	1	0	3	0	48	3
Hull City	2026–27	Premier League	5	0	0	0	1	0	0	0	6	0
Hull City	Total		58	3	2	0	2	0	3	0	65	3
Career Total			440	27	18	1	11	1	12	1	481	30

=== International ===
As of match played on 17 November 2026

Appearances and goals by national team and year
National team	Year	Apps	Goals
Republic of Ireland	2017	2	0
Republic of Ireland	2018	2	0
Republic of Ireland	2019	4	0
Republic of Ireland	2020	4	0
Republic of Ireland	2021	9	1
Republic of Ireland	2022	9	2
Republic of Ireland	2023	6	0
Republic of Ireland	2024	0	0
Republic of Ireland	2025	1	0
Republic of Ireland	2026	4	0
Total		41	3

==== International goals ====
Scores and results list Ireland's goal tally first.

No.	Date	Venue	Opponent	Score	Result	Competition
1	1 September 2021	Estádio Algarve, Algarve, Portugal	Portugal	1–0	1–2	2022 FIFA World Cup qualification
2	24 September 2022	Hampden Park, Glasgow, Scotland	Scotland	1–0	1–2	2022-23 UEFA Nations League B
3	27 September 2022	Aviva Stadium, Dublin, Ireland	Armenia	1–0	3–2	2022-23 UEFA Nations League B

== Honours ==
Sheffield United

- EFL Championship second-place promotion: 2018–19, 2022–23

Hull City

- EFL Championship play-offs: 2026

Individual

- Gillingham Player of the Year: 2014–15
- PFA Team of the Year: 2015–16 League One
- Sheffield United Community Player of the Year: 2019–20, 2020–21
- FAI Senior International Player of the Year: 2020
