= 2012 Peace Cup =

2012 Peace Cup Suwon

Tournament details
- Host country: South Korea
- Dates: 19–22 July
- Teams: 4 (from 2 confederations)
- Venue: 1 (in 1 host city)

Final positions
- Champions: (Germany) Hamburger SV (1st title)

Tournament statistics
- Matches played: 4
- Goals scored: 10 (2.5 per match)
- Top scorer(s): Mitchell Schet (Groningen, 2 goals)
- Best player(s): Marcus Berg (Hamburger SV)

The 2012 Peace Cup Suwon was an invitational friendly football tournament. It was the fifth competition of the Peace Cup, and was held in South Korea's Suwon World Cup Stadium from 19 to 22 July. Unification Church, the host of the tournament, invited three European clubs, each of which had a South Korean player, in addition to its club Seongnam Ilhwa Chunma. Three invited clubs Groningen, Hamburger SV and Sunderland were having Suk Hyun-jun, Son Heung-min and Ji Dong-won, respectively.

== Teams ==
Team	League
(Netherlands) Groningen	2012–13 Eredivisie
(Germany) Hamburger SV	2012–13 Bundesliga
(South Korea) Seongnam Ilhwa Chunma	2012 K League
(England) Sunderland	2012–13 Premier League

== Semi-finals ==
19 July 2012
19:00 KST

Seongnam Ilhwa Chunma (South Korea)	1–0	(England) Sunderland
Éverton Santos 29'

Suwon World Cup Stadium, Suwon
Attendance: 19,074
Referee: Malik Abdul Bashir (Singapore)

20 July 2012
19:30 KST

Hamburger SV (Germany)	2–1	(Netherlands) Groningen
Aogo 15' (pen.); Iličević 80'		Schet 28'

Suwon World Cup Stadium, Suwon

== Third place play-off ==
22 July 2012
16:30 KST

Sunderland (England)	3–2	(Netherlands) Groningen
Wickham 20'; Campbell 89'; Noble 90'		Suk Hyun-jun 38'; Schet 45'

Suwon World Cup Stadium, Suwon

== Final ==
22 July 2012
19:30 KST

Seongnam Ilhwa Chunma (South Korea)	0–1	(Germany) Hamburger SV
		Berg 81'

Suwon World Cup Stadium, Suwon

== Goalscorers ==
2 goals

- (Netherlands) Mitchell Schet (Groningen)

1 goal

- (Germany) Dennis Aogo (Hamburger SV)
- (Sweden) Marcus Berg (Hamburger SV)
- (Croatia) Ivo Iličević (Hamburger SV)
- (Brazil) Éverton Santos (Seongnam Ilhwa Chunma)
- (England) Fraizer Campbell (Sunderland)
- (England) Ryan Noble (Sunderland)
- (England) Connor Wickham (Sunderland)
- (South Korea) Suk Hyun-jun (Groningen)
