= 2011–12 Sunderland A.F.C. season =

English football club season

Sunderland A.F.C.
2011–12 season
- Chairman: Niall Quinn (until 20 February); Ellis Short (from 20 February)
- Manager: Steve Bruce (until 30 November); Eric Black (caretaker); Martin O'Neill (from 30 November)
- Stadium: Stadium of Light
- Premier League: 13th
- League Cup: Second round
- FA Cup: Sixth round
- Top goalscorer: League: Nicklas Bendtner (8); All: Nicklas Bendtner (8); Sebastian Larsson (8); Stéphane Sessègnon (8)
- Highest home attendance: 47,751 (vs. Newcastle United)
- Lowest home attendance: 26,042 (vs. Arsenal)
- Average home league attendance: 39,095
Home colours	Away colours

The 2011–12 season, Sunderland competed in the Premier League. They finished the season in 13th place, ending with a total of 45 points.

== Results ==
=== Pre-season ===
Date	Opponents	H/A	Result F–A	Scorers
13 July 2011	York City	A	2–1	Bardsley 13', Tounkara 33'
17 July 2011	Arminia Bielefeld	A	1–1	Sessègnon 74'
20 July 2011	Hannover 96	A	1–3	Sessègnon 52'
23 July 2011	Borussia Mönchengladbach	A	0–0	–
27 July 2011	Kilmarnock	A	2–1	Sessègnon 36', Wickham 75'
30 July 2011	Burnley	A	0–1	–
2 August 2011	Hartlepool	A	3–1	Gyan 31', Colback 49', Larsson 59'
3 August 2011	Darlington	A	3–0	Cook 26', Gardner 41', Ji 63'
6 August 2011	Hibernian	A	0–0	–

=== Premier League ===
Date	Opponents	H/A	Result H–A	Scorers	Attendance	League position	Manager
13 August 2011	Liverpool	A	1–1	Larsson 57'	45,018	5th	Bruce
20 August 2011	Newcastle United	H	0–1	–	47,751	13th	Bruce
27 August 2011	Swansea City	A	0–0	–	19,938	13th	Bruce
10 September 2011	Chelsea	H	1–2	Ji 90'	36,699	16th	Bruce
18 September 2011	Stoke City	H	4–0	Bramble 5', Woodgate 11' o.g., Gardner 28', Larsson 59'	32,296	12th	Bruce
26 September 2011	Norwich City	A	2–1	Richardson 86'	26,107	14th	Bruce
1 October 2011	West Bromwich Albion	H	2–2	Bendtner 24', Elmohamady 26'	34,815	16th	Bruce
16 October 2011	Arsenal	A	2–1	Larsson 31'	60,078	17th	Bruce
22 October 2011	Bolton Wanderers	A	0–2	Sessègnon 82', Bendtner 90'	24,349	14th	Bruce
29 October 2011	Aston Villa	H	2–2	Wickham 38', Sessègnon 89'	37,062	14th	Bruce
5 November 2011	Manchester United	A	1–0	–	75,570	15th	Bruce
19 November 2011	Fulham	H	0–0	–	37,688	15th	Bruce
26 November 2011	Wigan Athletic	H	1–2	Larsson 8'	37,883	16th	Bruce
4 December 2011	Wolverhampton Wanderers	A	2–1	Richardson 52'	25,145	17th	Black
11 December 2011	Blackburn Rovers	H	2–1	Vaughan 83', Larsson 90'	39,863	16th	O'Neill
18 December 2011	Tottenham Hotspur	A	1–0	–	36,021	16th	O'Neill
21 December 2011	Queens Park Rangers	A	2–3	Bendtner 19', Sessègnon 53', Brown 89'	16,167	15th	O'Neill
26 December 2011	Everton	H	1–1	Colback 26'	43,619	14th	O'Neill
1 January 2012	Manchester City	H	1–0	Ji 90'	40,625	13th	O'Neill
3 January 2012	Wigan Athletic	A	1–4	Gardner 45', McClean 55', Sessègnon 73', Vaughan 80'	15,871	10th	O'Neill
14 January 2012	Chelsea	A	1–0	–	41,696	12th	O'Neill
21 January 2012	Swansea City	H	2–0	Sessègnon 14', Gardner 85'	36,904	10th	O'Neill
1 February 2012	Norwich City	H	3–0	Campbell 21', Sessègnon 28', Ayala 54' o.g.	34,476	8th	O'Neill
4 February 2012	Stoke City	A	0–1	McClean 60'	27,717	8th	O'Neill
11 February 2012	Arsenal	H	1–2	McClean 70'	40,312	9th	O'Neill
25 February 2012	West Bromwich Albion	A	4–0	–	25,311	9th	O'Neill
4 March 2012	Newcastle United	A	1–1	Bendtner 24' (pen)	52,388	11th	O'Neill
10 March 2012	Liverpool	H	1–0	Bendtner 56'	41,661	8th	O'Neill
20 March 2012	Blackburn Rovers	A	2–0	–	20,056	9th	O'Neill
24 March 2012	Queens Park Rangers	H	3–1	Bendtner 41', McClean 70', Sessègnon 76'	37,128	8th	O'Neill
31 March 2012	Manchester City	A	3–3	Larsson 31' 55', Bendtner 45'	47,007	9th	O'Neill
7 April 2012	Tottenham Hotspur	H	0–0	–	39,335	9th	O'Neill
9 April 2012	Everton	A	4–0	–	32,249	11th	O'Neill
14 April 2012	Wolverhampton Wanderers	H	0–0	–	37,476	9th	O'Neill
21 April 2012	Aston Villa	A	0–0	–	32,557	11th	O'Neill
28 April 2012	Bolton Wanderers	H	2–2	Bendtner 36', McClean 55'	40,768	11th	O'Neill
6 May 2012	Fulham	A	2–1	Bardsley 35'	25,683	11th	O'Neill
13 May 2012	Manchester United	H	0–1	–	46,452	13th	O'Neill

==== Managerial change ====
Outgoing manager	Manner of departure	Date of vacancy	Position in table	Incoming manager	Date of appointment
(England) Steve Bruce	Sacked	30 November 2011	16th	(Scotland) Eric Black	30 November 2011
(Scotland) Eric Black	Contract terminated	3 December 2011	17th	(Northern Ireland) Martin O'Neill	3 December 2011

After winning just 2 of their first 13 Premier League games and following the defeat by Wigan Athletic, chairman Ellis Short moved to sack Steve Bruce on 30 November. Assistant manager Eric Black assumed first team responsibilities until a new manager could be found. Martin O'Neill was appointed manager on 3 December with a three-year contract.

==== Table ====
Pos	Team	Pld	W	D	L	GF	GA	GD	Pts
11	Swansea City	38	12	11	15	44	51	−7	47
12	Norwich City	38	12	11	15	52	66	−14	47
13	Sunderland	38	11	12	15	45	46	−1	45
14	Stoke City	38	11	12	15	36	53	−17	45
15	Wigan Athletic	38	11	10	17	42	62	−20	43

Source: Barclays Premier League
Rules for classification: 1) points; 2) goal difference; 3) number of goals scored.

=== League Cup ===
Date	Round	Opponents	H/A	Result H–A	Scorers	Attendance
23 August 2011	Second round	Brighton & Hove Albion	A	1–0	–	17,090

==== FA Cup ====
Date	Round	Opponents	H/A	Result H–A	Scorers	Attendance
8 January 2012	Third round	Peterborough United	A	2–0	Larsson 48', McClean 58'	8,954
29 January 2012	Fourth round	Middlesbrough	H	1–1	Campbell 59'	33,275
8 February 2012	Replay	Middlesbrough	A	1–2 AET	Colback 41', Sessègnon 113'	26,707
18 February 2012	Fifth round	Arsenal	H	2–0	Richardson 40', Oxlade-Chamberlain o.g. 77'	26,042
17 March 2012	Sixth round	Everton	A	1–1	Bardsley 12'	38,875
27 March 2012	Replay	Everton	H	0–2	–	43,140

== Statistics ==
=== Appearances and goals ===
As of 13 May 2012

No.	Pos	Nat	Player	Total		Premier League		FA Cup		League Cup	
No.	Pos	Nat	Player	Apps	Goals	Apps	Goals	Apps	Goals	Apps	Goals
1	GK	(Scotland) SCO	Craig Gordon	1	0	1	0	0	0	0	0
2	DF	(Scotland) SCO	Phil Bardsley	37	2	29+2	1	6	1	0	0
3	DF	(England) ENG	Wayne Bridge	10	0	3+5	0	2	0	0	0
4	DF	(England) ENG	Michael Turner	29	0	23+1	0	4+1	0	0	0
5	DF	(England) ENG	Wes Brown	22	1	20	1	1	0	1	0
6	MF	(England) ENG	Lee Cattermole	27	0	23	0	3	0	1	0
7	MF	(Sweden) SWE	Sebastian Larsson	39	8	32	7	6	1	1	0
8	MF	(England) ENG	Craig Gardner	37	3	22+8	3	6	0	1	0
9	FW	(England) ENG	Fraizer Campbell	17	2	6+6	1	2+3	1	0	0
10	FW	(England) ENG	Connor Wickham	19	1	5+11	1	1+1	0	0+1	0
11	MF	(England) ENG	Kieran Richardson	34	3	26+3	2	4	1	1	0
12	DF	(England) ENG	Matthew Kilgallon	11	0	9+1	0	1	0	0	0
14	MF	(England) ENG	Jack Colback	40	2	29+6	1	3+1	1	1	0
15	MF	(Wales) WAL	David Vaughan	27	2	17+5	2	2+2	0	1	0
16	DF	(Republic of Ireland) IRL	John O'Shea	34	0	29	0	5	0	0	0
17	FW	(South Korea) KOR	Ji Dong-Won	21	2	2+17	2	0+1	0	0+1	0
18	MF	(Republic of Ireland) IRL	David Meyler	9	0	1+6	0	0+2	0	0	0
19	DF	(England) ENG	Titus Bramble	8	1	8	1	0	0	0	0
20	GK	(Republic of Ireland) IRL	Keiren Westwood	10	0	8+1	0	0	0	1	0
21	FW	(France) FRA	Oumare Tounkara	0	0	0	0	0	0	0	0
22	GK	(Belgium) BEL	Simon Mignolet	35	0	29	0	6	0	0	0
23	MF	(Republic of Ireland) IRL	James McClean	29	6	20+3	5	6	1	0	0
25	DF	(Greece) GRE	Sotirios Kyrgiakos	4	0	2+1	0	1	0	0	0
26	FW	(England) ENG	Jordan Cook	0	0	0	0	0	0	0	0
27	MF	(Egypt) EGY	Ahmed Elmohamady	21	1	7+11	1	0+2	0	1	0
28	MF	(Benin) BEN	Stéphane Sessègnon	41	8	36	7	4	1	1	0
31	FW	(England) ENG	Ryan Noble	2	0	0+2	0	0	0	0	0
38	FW	(England) ENG	Craig Lynch	0	0	0	0	0	0	0	0
40	DF	(England) ENG	Louis Laing	0	0	0	0	0	0	0	0
42	DF	(Republic of Ireland) IRL	John Egan	0	0	0	0	0	0	0	0
52	FW	(Denmark) DEN	Nicklas Bendtner	30	8	25+3	8	2	0	0	0
Players that played for Sunderland this season that have left the club or went out on loan:
3	FW	(Ghana) GHA	Asamoah Gyan	4	0	3	0	0	0	0+1	0
29	DF	(England) ENG	Anton Ferdinand	4	0	3	0	0	0	1	0

=== Goal scorers ===
Position	Nation	Number	Name	Premier League	FA Cup	League Cup	Total
FW	(Denmark)	52	Nicklas Bendtner	8	0	0	8
MF	(Sweden)	7	Sebastian Larsson	7	1	0	8
FW	(Benin)	28	Stéphane Sessègnon	7	1	0	8
MF	(Republic of Ireland)	23	James McClean	5	1	0	6
MF	(England)	8	Craig Gardner	3	0	0	3
DF	(England)	11	Kieran Richardson	2	1	0	3
FW	(South Korea)	17	Ji Dong-Won	2	0	0	2
MF	(Wales)	15	David Vaughan	2	0	0	2
FW	(England)	9	Fraizer Campbell	1	1	0	2
MF	(England)	14	Jack Colback	1	1	0	2
DF	(Scotland)	2	Phil Bardsley	1	1	0	2
DF	(England)	5	Wes Brown	1	0	0	1
MF	(Egypt)	27	Ahmed Elmohamady	1	0	0	1
FW	(England)	10	Connor Wickham	1	0	0	1
			Own goals	2	1	0	3
			Totals	44	8	0	52

=== Overall ===
Games played	45
Games won	14
Games drawn	14
Games lost	17
Goals scored	53
Goals conceded	52
Goal difference	+1
Clean sheets	13
Most appearances	Sessègnon 42
Top scorer	Bendtner 8

Updated 13 May 2012

== Squad ==
Squad at end of season

Note: Flags indicate national team as defined under FIFA eligibility rules; some limited exceptions apply. Players may hold more than one non-FIFA nationality.

No.	Pos.	Nation	Player
1	GK	SCO	Craig Gordon
2	DF	SCO	Phil Bardsley
3	DF	ENG	Wayne Bridge (on loan from Manchester City)
4	DF	ENG	Michael Turner
5	DF	ENG	Wes Brown (vice-captain)
6	MF	ENG	Lee Cattermole (captain)
7	MF	SWE	Sebastian Larsson
8	MF	ENG	Craig Gardner
9	FW	ENG	Fraizer Campbell
10	FW	ENG	Connor Wickham
11	DF	ENG	Kieran Richardson
12	DF	ENG	Matthew Kilgallon
14	MF	ENG	Jack Colback

No.	Pos.	Nation	Player
15	MF	WAL	David Vaughan
16	DF	IRL	John O'Shea
17	FW	KOR	Ji Dong-Won
18	MF	IRL	David Meyler
19	DF	ENG	Titus Bramble
20	GK	IRL	Keiren Westwood
22	GK	BEL	Simon Mignolet
23	MF	IRL	James McClean
24	GK	NIR	Trevor Carson
25	DF	GRE	Sotirios Kyrgiakos (on loan from Wolfsburg)
27	MF	EGY	Ahmed Elmohamady
28	MF	BEN	Stéphane Sessègnon
52	FW	DEN	Nicklas Bendtner (on loan from Arsenal)

== Transfers ==
=== In ===
No.	Pos.	Nat.	Name	Age	EU	Moving from	Type	Transfer window	Ends	Transfer fee	Source
27	MF	(Egypt)	Ahmed Elmohamady	23	Non-EU	ENPPI	Transfer	Summer	2014	£2,000,000	The Guardian
10	FW	(England)	Connor Wickham	18	EU	Ipswich Town	Transfer	Summer	2015	£12,000,000	The Guardian
17	FW	(South Korea)	Ji Dong-Won	20	Non-EU	Chunnam Dragons	Transfer	Summer	2014	£2,000,000	BBC Sport
8	MF	(England)	Craig Gardner	24	EU	Birmingham City	Transfer	Summer	2014	£6,000,000	BBC Sport
7	MF	(Sweden)	Sebastian Larsson	26	EU	Birmingham City (England)	Transfer	Summer	2014	Free	The Guardian
20	GK	(Republic of Ireland)	Keiren Westwood	26	EU	Coventry City	Transfer	Summer	2014	Free	The Guardian
	MF	(England)	Roarie Deacon	19	EU	Arsenal	Transfer	Summer		Free	
5	DF	(England)	Wes Brown	31	EU	Manchester United	Transfer	Summer		£1,000,000	
16	DF	(Republic of Ireland)	John O'Shea	30	EU	Manchester United (England)	Transfer	Summer		£5,000,000	
15	MF	(Wales)	David Vaughan	28	EU	Blackpool (England)	Transfer	Summer		Free	
23	MF	(Republic of Ireland)	James McClean	22	EU	Derry City (Northern Ireland)	Transfer	Summer		£350,000	
52	FW	(Denmark)	Nicklas Bendtner	23	EU	Arsenal (England)	Loan	Summer		Season-long loan	
3	DF	(England)	Wayne Bridge	31	EU	Manchester City	Loan	Winter		Season-long loan	
25	DF	(Greece)	Sotirios Kyrgiakos	32	EU	VfL Wolfsburg (Germany)	Loan	Winter		Season-long loan	

Total spending: ▼£28,350,000

=== Out ===
No.	Pos.	Nat.	Name	Age	EU	Moving to	Type	Transfer window	Transfer fee	Source
	MF	(Netherlands)	Boudewijn Zenden	34	EU	Retired	Contract expired	Summer	Released	
14	MF	(England)	Jordan Henderson	20	EU	Liverpool	Transfer	Summer	£16,000,000	
2	DF	(France)	Jean-Yves Mvoto	22	EU	Oldham Athletic	Transfer	Summer	Released	
14	MF	(England)	Nathan Luscombe	21	EU	Hartlepool	Transfer	Summer	Released	
10	MF	(Northern Ireland)	Robbie Weir	22	EU	Tranmere Rovers	Transfer	Summer	Released	
17	DF	(England)	Michael Kay	21	EU	Tranmere Rovers	Transfer	Summer	Released	
16	MF	(Paraguay)	Cristian Riveros	28	Non-EU	Kayserispor (Turkey)	Loan	Summer	Season-long loan	
17	MF	(England)	Liam Noble	20	EU	Carlisle United	Loan	Summer	Loan	
25	MF	(France)	Steed Malbranque	31	EU	Saint-Étienne (France)	Transfer	Summer	£1,000,000	
3	DF	(Northern Ireland)	George McCartney	30	EU	West Ham United	Loan	Summer	Season-long loan	
35	DF	(England)	Anton Ferdinand	26	EU	Queens Park Rangers	Transfer	Summer	£3,000,000	
24	DF	(England)	Blair Adams	20	EU	Brentford	Loan	None	Loan	
3	FW	(Ghana)	Asamoah Gyan	25	Non-EU	Al Ain (United Arab Emirates)	Loan	None	Season-long loan, £6,000,000 loan fee received	
30	GK	(Northern Ireland)	Trevor Carson	23	EU	Bury	Loan	None	Season-long loan (recalled in November)	
37	MF	(England)	Adam Reed	20	EU	Bradford City	Loan	None	Month-long loan	
33	DF	(Jamaica)	Nyron Nosworthy	31	Non-EU	Watford	Loan	None	Season-long loan	
35	GK	(England)	Ben Wilson	19	EU	Harrogate Town	Loan	None	Month-long loan	
29	DF	(England)	Blair Adams	20	EU	Northampton Town	Loan	Winter	Two month loan	
37	DF	(Republic of Ireland)	John Egan	19	EU	Crystal Palace	Loan	Winter	Month-long loan	
27	GK	(England)	Ben Wilson	19	EU	Gateshead	Loan	Winter	Month-long loan	
33	DF	(Jamaica)	Nyron Nosworthy	31	Non-EU	Watford	Transfer	Winter	Undisclosed	
34	MF	(England)	Billy Knott	19	EU	AFC Wimbledon	Loan	Winter	Month-long loan	
17	MF	(England)	Liam Noble	20	EU	Carlisle United	Transfer	Winter	Released	
36	GK	(Northern Ireland)	Trevor Carson	23	EU	Hull City	Loan	Winter	Month-long loan	
16	ST	(England)	Jordan Cook	21	EU	Carlisle United	Loan	Winter	Two month loan	
3	DF	(England)	Louis Laing	18	EU	Wycombe Wanderers	Loan	Winter	Season-long loan	
12	FW	(England)	Ryan Noble	20	EU	Derby County	Loan	Winter	Month-long loan	
24	GK	(England)	Jordan Pickford	17	EU	Darlington	Loan	Winter	Month-long loan	
19	DF	(Northern Ireland)	Liam Bagnall	19	EU	Darlington	Loan	Winter	Month-long loan	
30	GK	(Northern Ireland)	Trevor Carson	23	EU	Bury	Loan	None	Season-long loan	
29	DF	(England)	Michael Liddle	22	EU	Accrington Stanley	Loan	None	Month-long loan	
26	DF	(Republic of Ireland)	John Egan	19	EU	Sheffield United	Loan	None	Month-long loan	
8	MF	(England)	Adam Reed	20	EU	Leyton Orient	Loan	None	Season-long loan	
35	FW	(England)	Ryan Noble	20	EU	Hartlepool United	Loan	None	Season-long loan	
24	GK	(England)	Lewis King	18	EU	Stockport County	Loan	None	Month-long loan	
36	FW	(France)	Oumare Tounkara	21	EU	Oldham Athletic	Loan	None	Season-long loan	

EU = if holds or not a European Union passport; Country: when 2 flags, 1st flag = country that plays for internationally, 2nd flag = country of birth; N = number on jersey; P = Position (for position name, pause mouse pointer on abbreviation); Name = Name on jersey (for more extensive name, pause mouse pointer on name); Age = age on the day of the signing; Moving from = only indicate the club the player was playing before start playing for this club in this season, for the type of the moving see Status column; Moving to = only indicates the club the player is going to play next, for the type of the moving see Status column; Ends = when the player's current contract ends; n/a = Not applicable. Total income: ▲£25,000,000

== Awards ==
=== Monthly awards ===
Award	Month/Round	Winner
Premier League Manager of the Month	December	Martin O'Neill
FA Cup Player of the Round	Fifth round	Kieran Richardson

=== End of Season Awards ===
Supporters' Association's Young Player of the Year	Supporters' Association's Player of the Year	Player of the Year	Young Player of the Year	Goal of the Season	Save of the Season	Team Performance of the Season
James McClean	Stéphane Sessègnon	Stéphane Sessègnon	James McClean	Fraizer Campbell against Norwich City	Simon Mignolet against Newcastle United	1–0 win against Manchester City

== See also ==
- Sunderland A.F.C. seasons
