= 2007–08 Manchester United F.C. season =

English football club season

Manchester United
2007–08 season
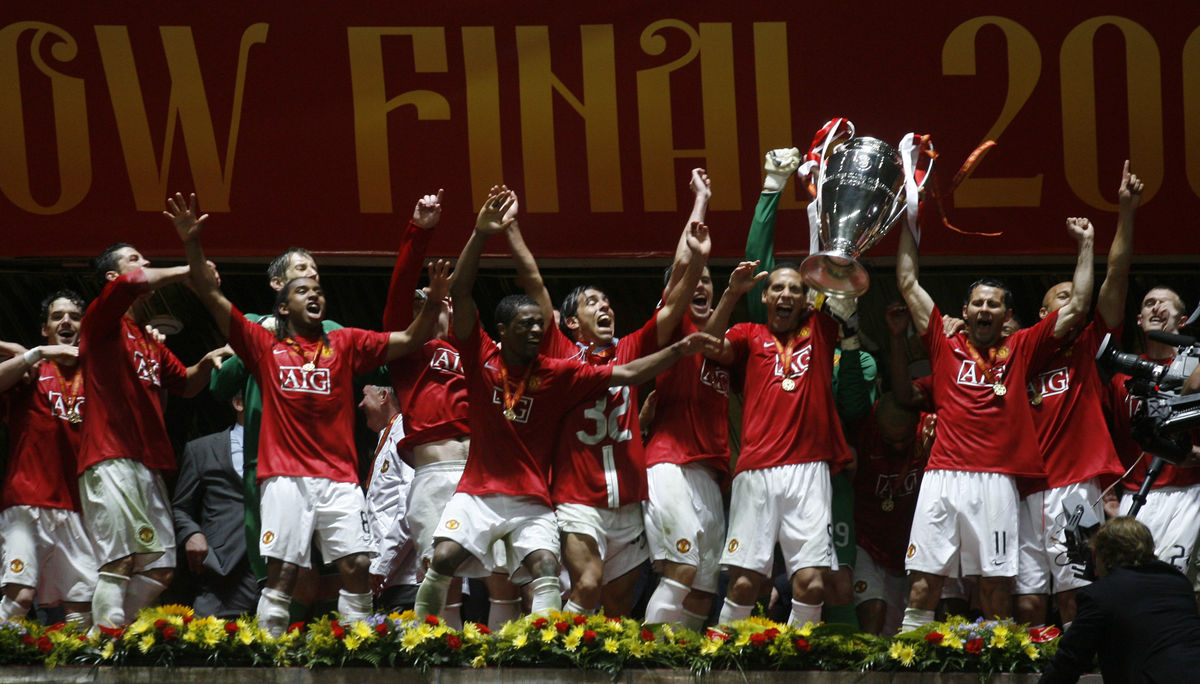
- Manchester United celebrate their third Champions League title.
- Co-chairmen: Joel and Avram Glazer
- Manager: Sir Alex Ferguson
- Stadium: Old Trafford
- Premier League: 1st
- FA Cup: Sixth round
- League Cup: Third round
- UEFA Champions League: Winners
- FA Community Shield: Winners
- Top goalscorer: League: Cristiano Ronaldo (31); All: Cristiano Ronaldo (42)
- Highest home attendance: 76,013 (vs. West Ham United, 3 May)
- Lowest home attendance: 73,652 (vs. Roma, 2 October)
- Average home league attendance: 75,689
Home colours	Away colours	Third colours

The 2007–08 season was Manchester United's 16th season in the Premier League, and their 33rd consecutive season in the top division of English football. Despite a slow start in the league, they won their 10th Premier League title (their 17th top division title overall, just one behind Liverpool's then record of 18) and beat Chelsea on penalties in the 2008 UEFA Champions League final to claim the European Double.

Although they won the 2007 FA Community Shield against Chelsea, the club was not as successful in the domestic cup competitions, losing to eventual FA Cup winners Portsmouth in the Sixth Round, and losing to Coventry City in the Third Round of the League Cup.

In February 2008, the club commemorated the 50th anniversary of the Munich air disaster, as a result of which eight Manchester United players and three members of the coaching staff lost their lives. The club held a memorial service at Old Trafford on 6 February 2008, renaming the tunnel under the South Stand as the "Munich Tunnel". This was followed on 10 February by the Manchester derby. Manchester United took to the field in a retro kit reminiscent of the kit worn by the 1958 team, abandoning squad numbers in favour of a 1–11 numbering system.

Manchester United's players were also successful on an individual level in the 2007–08 season, with three players in the PFA Premier League Team of the Year, while Cristiano Ronaldo picked up six individual awards, including the Premier League Golden Boot for his 31 league goals.

== Pre-season and friendlies ==
United began their pre-season in July 2007 with a tour of the Far East where they played Urawa Red Diamonds, FC Seoul, Shenzhen FC and Guangzhou Pharmaceutical; they went undefeated throughout the entire tour, winning three matches and drawing one. Their next game took place back at Old Trafford, against Internazionale, followed by trips to Doncaster Rovers and Peterborough United, managed by Alex Ferguson's son Darren. The next two matches were played simultaneously with first team coach Jimmy Ryan taking one squad to Scotland to play Dunfermline, while assistant manager Carlos Queiroz took another group to play Glentoran in Northern Ireland.

In January 2008, Manchester United played Al-Hilal of Saudi Arabia in a testimonial match for Sami Al-Jaber as part of a mid-season training camp, hosted by the Saudi royal family. United lost the match 3–2.

Date	Opponents	H / A	Result F–A	Scorers	Attendance
17 July 2007	Urawa Red Diamonds	A	2–2	Fletcher 47', Ronaldo 52'	58,716
20 July 2007	FC Seoul	A	4–0	Ronaldo 5', Eagles 18', Rooney 20', Evra 60'	64,000
23 July 2007	Shenzhen Xiangxue	N	6–0	Giggs 12', Rooney 20', Nani 22', O'Shea 54', Ronaldo 56', Eagles 63'	15,000
27 July 2007	Guangzhou Pharmaceutical	N	3–0	Rooney 12' (pen.), Nani 43', Martin 53'	50,000
1 August 2007	Internazionale	H	2–3	Rooney 18', Adriano 50' (o.g.)	73,738
3 August 2007	Doncaster Rovers	A	2–0	Gibson 70', Evans 90'	13,080
4 August 2007	Peterborough United	A	3–1	Eckersley 23', Jones 72', Dong 82'	
8 August 2007	Glentoran	A	3–0	Campbell 5', Evra 14', Nani 37'	14,500
8 August 2007	Dunfermline Athletic	A	4–0	Eagles 27', Giggs 35', Rooney (2) 63' (pen.), 85'	11,200
21 January 2008	Al-Hilal	A	2–3	Tevez 25', Ronaldo 33'	70,000

== FA Community Shield ==
In August, League champions United contested the Community Shield against Chelsea, the winners of the previous season's FA Cup. The game finished 1–1 after 90 minutes, United winning the game on penalties.

Date	Opponents	H / A	Result F–A	Scorers	Attendance
5 August 2007	Chelsea	N	1–1 (3–0p)	Giggs 35'	80,731

== Premier League ==
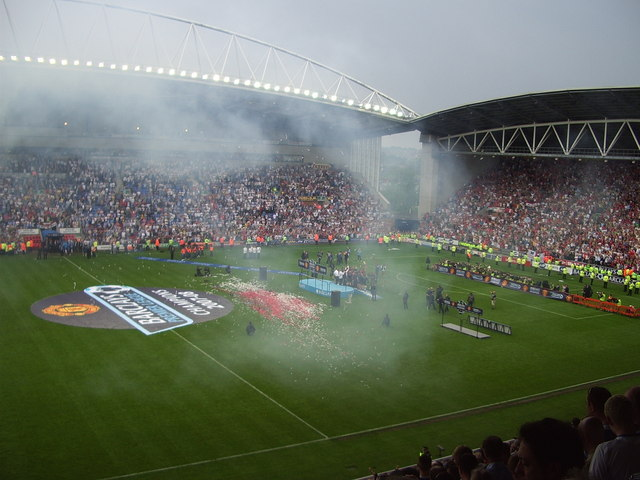
Manchester United being crowned Premier League champions at the JJB Stadium on the final day of the season

=== August–December ===
Manchester United started the season by drawing their opening two games against Reading and Portsmouth. United lost Wayne Rooney to a foot injury picked up against Reading and Cristiano Ronaldo to suspension after he was sent off for appearing to headbutt Portsmouth's Richard Hughes. A derby defeat to Manchester City saw the club slip into 17th place in the table. Results elsewhere pushed them into the relegation zone for the first time in years.

The following week at home to Tottenham Hotspur, Nani scored his first competitive goal for the club to give United their first win of the season. Two more 1–0 victories followed, first against Sunderland, where Louis Saha scored in his first game back from injury, and then away to Everton through a Nemanja Vidić header. Next up were Chelsea, fellow members of the Big Four who had parted company with manager José Mourinho only two days earlier, following a run of poor form, appointing his assistant Avram Grant in his place. Chelsea's poor form continued into their next match, and the Reds claimed a 2–0 victory, goals from Carlos Tevez and Louis Saha coming at the end of each half.

After eight games of the season, United had conceded just two goals, three less than at the same point in the previous season. However, the team was having trouble in front of goal, only scoring seven goals in the same eight games. This changed on 6 October, however, when United beat Wigan Athletic 4–0, followed by their 7th and 8th consecutive league wins, both 4–1, against Aston Villa and Middlesbrough, the latter being their fourth consecutive game in which they have scored four goals, the first time in 100 years they had done so. United then travelled to London where they played Arsenal, in a very media-hyped game, which ended 2–2 after a William Gallas equaliser for the Gunners in the last minute of stoppage time. Despite the Arsenal draw, United got back on track by beating Blackburn 2–0 the following week, as Cristiano Ronaldo scored two goals in two minutes to secure the win.

United's ten-game unbeaten streak in the league came to an end when they travelled to the Reebok Stadium to play Bolton Wanderers, who beat them 1–0 with an early Nicolas Anelka goal. United returned to winning ways immediately, winning their next five games, including one against arch-rivals Liverpool at Anfield, in which Carlos Tevez scored the only goal for a 1–0 win. United then completed a double over Merseyside teams in consecutive weeks with a 2–1 victory over Everton, both goals scored by Cristiano Ronaldo, before completing a double over Sunderland in the Boxing Day fixture, winning 4–0. The Sunderland game saw Ronaldo score his ninth goal in his last seven Premier League appearances, to extend his lead at the top of the Premier League scoring table, while United welcomed Park Ji-sung back to the team following a nine-month lay-off with cruciate ligament damage.

With Wayne Rooney and Michael Carrick unavailable due to a viral infection, Carlos Tevez was given the opportunity to start the game on his return to his old club, West Ham United, on 29 December. United took the lead on 14 minutes thanks to a Cristiano Ronaldo header. Ronaldo had a chance to double the lead with a penalty in the 66th minute, but he blasted the free shot wide of the goal. West Ham capitalised on the error and, 10 minutes later, Rio Ferdinand's brother, Anton, headed home the equaliser. Then, just five minutes later, Matthew Upson scored the winner for the Hammers to complete a trio of headed goals on the day. The loss, combined with Arsenal's 4–1 defeat of Everton later in the day, meant that United finished 2007 in second place, with 18 games still to play.

=== January–March ===
The following game was a hard-fought 1–0 win over Birmingham City with the only goal coming from Carlos Tevez. Sir Alex Ferguson caused a minor controversy after the match, when he claimed that the atmosphere at Old Trafford was like a funeral. He later attempted to repair the damage when praising the away support when United went to Villa Park in the FA Cup Third Round on 5 January. The games against West Ham and Birmingham saw Ferguson endure a two-match touchline suspension, given following his complaints to the referee in the defeat at Bolton Wanderers.

The next game was against manager-less Newcastle United and was played immediately after Arsenal had been held to a 1–1 draw by Birmingham City. United went into the game knowing that a win would put them top of the league on goal difference, but after dominating the first 45 minutes the score was still 0–0. However, in the second half, the goals started flowing; Ronaldo opened the scoring in the 49th minute with a free kick under the jumping wall. Carlos Tevez doubled the tally six minutes later, before Ronaldo scored again to make it three in the 70th minute. Rio Ferdinand scored a rare goal in the 85th minute, volleying home from a narrow angle. Youngster Danny Simpson had a couple of chances, but he was denied by some good goalkeeping by Shay Given. Then, in the last two minutes, Ronaldo scored his third for his first ever Manchester United hat-trick, and Tevez made it six in injury time. Newcastle's captain, former Red Alan Smith, earned himself a red card for his protests following the sixth goal.

Wayne Rooney got himself on the scoresheet for the first time in three Premier League games the following weekend, scoring the opener in a 2–0 win over Reading. After a goalless first half, Rooney opened the scoring in the 77th minute, before Cristiano Ronaldo notched up his 23rd goal of the season to equal his tally for the previous season. The following game pitted United against Portsmouth at Old Trafford. With Arsenal having beaten Newcastle 3–0 the previous day, the onus was on United to pick up a win and go back to the top of the table. They started well, going 2–0 up within the first 15 minutes, but, despite what Sir Alex Ferguson claimed was one of the best performances of the season, they were unable to score again, and the game finished 2–0. Both goals were scored by Cristiano Ronaldo, who added the brace to the two he scored against Tottenham in the FA Cup the previous weekend, to take his total for the season to 27 goals in all competitions.

The next game for the Reds was away to Tottenham. With Arsenal playing and winning again earlier in the day, a win was essential for United to go back to the top of the league. However, Tottenham did their North London rivals a massive favour by going ahead in the 21st minute. They should have gone two up soon after, but a poor shot from Berbatov was saved by Edwin van der Sar. Spurs defended well for the remainder of the game, but conceded a volleyed goal from Tevez, who had been largely anonymous for the entire game, in the last minute. The result meant that United were two points behind Arsenal at the top of the league, but still four ahead of Chelsea, who drew 1–1 with Portsmouth. Seven United players were booked in the game at Tottenham, meaning that the club was handed a £25,000 fine by the Football Association. This was the standard fine for any team that has six or more players booked during a game. However, had the same occurred again in the season, the fine would have been increased to £50,000.

The Munich tribute kit

The week following the Tottenham game was spent in remembrance of the Munich air disaster, the 50th anniversary of which fell on 6 February 2008. United's home game against Manchester City on 10 February was preceded by a minute's silence in memory of those who died at Munich, and both teams wore special kits for the occasion; United wore a kit similar in design to the kit worn by the 1958 team, devoid of sponsors' logos and the club crest, while Manchester City also wore a kit without a sponsor's logo and with a black ribbon embroidered on the right shoulder. However, on a day intended to be all about the red half of Manchester, the team in blue took the lead after just 24 minutes. They then went 2–0 up just before half time, with debutant Benjani heading for goal. The Reds came out much stronger after the break, but were unable to score until the final minute, when Michael Carrick shot home from 18 yards. The next day, Arsenal beat Blackburn 2–0 to open up a five-point lead at the top of the table.

However, the Gunners lead was cut back to three points two weeks later. Arsenal drew 2–2 with Birmingham in the Saturday's early kick-off, providing United with the opportunity to close the gap at the top of the table. They took the chance with great gusto, beating Newcastle 5–1, the second time in the season that a fixture between the two clubs had produced six goals. Wayne Rooney opened the scoring for the Red Devils, before Cristiano Ronaldo doubled the lead just before half-time. He then extended the lead to 3–0 11 minutes into the second half with his 29th goal of the season. Newcastle clawed one back ten minutes from time, but United replied immediately through Rooney, and Louis Saha finished the game off in the final minute with what turned out to be the French player's final goal for the club before being sold to Everton in the summer.

The Premier League's top three kicked off simultaneously on 1 March. United were first off the mark, as Owen Hargreaves scored his first competitive goal in a Manchester United shirt to put the Reds 1–0 up against Fulham. Chelsea then went 3–0 up against West Ham in the space of five minutes, before Arsenal went 1–0 down to Aston Villa via a Philippe Senderos own goal. United were next to score, Park Ji-sung doubling their lead. Chelsea got a fourth goal in the 64th minute of their match, before a Simon Davies own goal stretched United's lead to three goals. However, just when it looked like United would be returning to the top of the table for the first time in a month, Arsenal snatched a late equaliser to remain a point clear at the top. With 10 games left in the season, United's goal difference seven goals better than Arsenal's, and Chelsea still only six points off the top two, this set up what was billed as one of the closest title races in recent years.

Following their exit from the FA Cup the previous weekend, a trip to Pride Park to play bottom-placed Derby County on 15 March looked to be the perfect opportunity for the Red Devils to bounce back and show their title credentials. However, the game did not prove as simple as one would have expected, as United had to work hard for their narrow 1–0 victory. As was the case with many of Manchester United's games in the 2007–08 season, luck was not on their side in the opening exchanges of the game. United goalkeeper Ben Foster, making his debut due to the unavailability of Van der Sar and Tomasz Kuszczak, then staked his claim to the number 1 jersey with a pair of fine saves from Derby striker Kenny Miller. Cristiano Ronaldo proved to be the thorn in Derby's side on a number of occasions, testing former Manchester United goalkeeper Roy Carroll with a curling effort hit with the outside of his foot and a 40-yard free kick. The breakthrough finally came in the 76th minute, Ronaldo scoring a deserved goal from a Wayne Rooney cross. With Arsenal only managing a draw against ten-man Middlesbrough in the day's late kick-off, United's win put them on top of the table on goal difference with a game in hand.

That game in hand was played four days later, with United playing host to Bolton Wanderers on 19 March. Man Utd started the game at their usual fast pace, and it took just nine minutes for Cristiano Ronaldo, the team's captain for the day, to find the back of the net after Carlos Tevez's poorly hit bicycle kick was saved. That goal brought Ronaldo level with George Best's record of 32 goals from midfield in a season, but only ten minutes later, the record was broken. Fouled about 10 yards outside the penalty area, Ronaldo set himself up for one of his trademark free kicks; one dipping shot later, the score was 2–0. The tone of the game changed from that point on, as United began to relax into a groove, but, as has happened so many times this season, despite the threat of a high-scoring game, no more goals were to come. Both teams posed threats to the other's goal, with Bolton managing to get the ball into the Manchester United net twice in the second half, only to have the goals ruled out for various reasons, while both Nani and Carlos Tevez wasted as many chances between them as the rest of the United team put together. Nevertheless, the win put United three points clear at the top of the table with eight games left to play.

With matches between Manchester United and Liverpool and Chelsea and Arsenal scheduled, 23 March 2008 was dubbed "Grand Slam Sunday" by Sky Sports. Manchester United kicked off the day's action, knowing that they could put pressure on both Arsenal and Chelsea by winning. However, the Red Devils took a while to get into their stride and Liverpool controlled the first ten minutes. Still, it was United who created the first chance of the game, although Wayne Rooney was unable to beat Pepe Reina after Anderson's through-ball. A few minutes later, Javier Mascherano was booked for a reckless challenge on Paul Scholes. The Argentinian was unimpressed, and continued to contest referee Steve Bennett's decisions as the game went on. The first goal of the game came in the 34th minute, through the most unlikely of goalscorers. After robbing Steven Gerrard of the ball two-thirds of the way up the field, Wes Brown continued his run into the Liverpool box, and found himself on the end of Wayne Rooney's cross, heading past a less than confident Reina. Then, a few minutes before half-time, Liverpool were awarded a free-kick just inside the United half. Believing that Paul Scholes deserved a yellow card for the challenge, Fernando Torres remonstrated with referee Bennett, for which he earned himself a yellow card. Incensed by his teammate's punishment, Mascherano rushed in to make his own protest. The referee, though, was not very receptive to Mascherano's protest, and gave him a second yellow card for dissent, sending him off.

With Liverpool down to ten men, Manchester United were now able to control the tempo of the game as they wished. The Red Devils pushed forward in search of a second goal, and Liverpool continued to weather the storm, but, with 10 minutes to go, United finally found the goal they were looking for. Nani, just on as a substitute, took a corner from the left hand side, which Cristiano Ronaldo headed in from seven yards; his first goal against Liverpool. Then, two minutes later, Nani combined well with Wayne Rooney, playing a one-two with the striker, before firing the ball home from 20 yards to make the final score 3–0. The win put United six points ahead of Arsenal with seven games left to play, and meant the Gunners had to win their match against Chelsea later that afternoon. Chelsea, however, came from behind to pull off a 2–1 victory. This propelled Chelsea into second place, five points behind Manchester United.

Man Utd's game against Aston Villa was the late kick-off on 29 March, which allowed Arsenal to pull back United's lead in the league to just three points with a 3–2 win over Bolton. This meant that the Red Devils would have to win to restore their six-point lead over Arsenal; and win they did, as they put four goals past Martin O'Neill's side. Villa were first to threaten either goal, but it took just 16 minutes for Cristiano Ronaldo to get the opener, back-heeling the ball through Martin Laursen's legs and past Scott Carson in the Villa goal. Ronaldo then turned provider for the second goal on 33 minutes, Carlos Tevez heading home the Portuguese's cross at the back post. The loudest cheers of the game, though, did not come until after half-time, as Wayne Rooney, who had not scored at Old Trafford since October, bagged a brace. Ronaldo supplied the first, back-heeling the ball to the England striker, who rounded Carson before passing the ball into the net. Ronaldo then provided the assist for Rooney's second, nutmegging an Aston Villa defender to play Rooney in. Heartened by his first goal in six games, Rooney finished the move with a cool shot, beating Carson on his near post. Rooney almost made it a hat-trick a few minutes later, but he was deemed to be marginally offside at the time of Owen Hargreaves' cross.

=== April–May ===
United were chosen to play on the Sunday of the following weekend, allowing the two chasing teams, Arsenal and Chelsea, to close the gap at the top. Arsenal played first, but could only draw with Liverpool, while Chelsea managed a 2–0 victory over Manchester City in the 3 o'clock kickoff. That closed the gap at the top to two points, putting pressure on United to pick up points against Middlesbrough, who are often regarded as one of their "bogey teams" in recent years. The Red Devils started well, and were 1–0 up within 10 minutes after Ronaldo stabbed home Michael Carrick's square ball across the six-yard box. United continued to make chances, and looked to be coasting to a comfortable victory until Afonso Alves netted his first goal in English football after 35 minutes. The Brazilian bagged his second ten minutes into the second half, and things looked desperate for United. Worse still, after 70 minutes, with United already missing Nemanja Vidić through injury, Rio Ferdinand looked to have picked up an injury himself and was replaced by Gerard Piqué. It was Piqué's fellow substitute, Park Ji-sung, who fashioned the equaliser, though, as he checked back inside Andrew Taylor before squaring the ball to Wayne Rooney, whose deflected shot found its way past Mark Schwarzer in the Middlesbrough goal. United continued to press forward in search of the winner to take the gap at the top of the table back to five points, but almost gave away a goal in the process. Van der Sar capped a solid display by blocking Tuncay's late effort.

The Red Devils' next game was against Arsenal the following Sunday, in a six-pointer that would either rule Arsenal out of the title race or bring them right back into it. A United win would put them six points ahead of their nearest league rivals, Chelsea, and nine ahead of Arsenal, and with Chelsea playing the following day, a win was essential to put pressure on the Blues. Arsenal started the match well, and looked to take the game to United through sheer brute force, attacking with pace and power. Indeed, they created the best chances of the half, United's best opportunity falling to Wayne Rooney, who refused to go down under the challenge of Kolo Touré, before seeing his shot saved by the foot of Jens Lehmann in a one-on-one situation. The first half finished goalless, but it was not long into the second half before the crowd saw the first goal of the game. It was a controversial goal, however, as it seemed that Emmanuel Adebayor had played Cesc Fàbregas' cross into the net with his left arm. Nevertheless, referee Howard Webb gave the goal, seeing nothing wrong with it. Just five minutes later, though, United hit back. Michael Carrick played the ball into the Arsenal penalty area, where it was handled by William Gallas, and the referee had no hesitation in awarding the penalty. As expected, Cristiano Ronaldo took responsibility for the penalty, and coolly swept it into the left side of the net. However, he was made to take the kick again as Park Ji-sung was deemed to be encroaching on the penalty area before the kick. Ronaldo was just as successful with his second attempt, burying the ball in the bottom left-hand corner. In an attempt to force the issue by going for the winner, Alex Ferguson brought on Carlos Tevez and Anderson in place of Park and Scholes. The Reds were cutting it fine, as Van der Sar was forced to make two reflex saves from his own defenders, Wes Brown and Rio Ferdinand. Tevez then sent a warning shot across the Arsenal bow, shooting narrowly wide from 25 yards. Then, with 20 minutes to go, Patrice Evra was brought down just outside the Arsenal box. With the Arsenal defence expecting a typical Ronaldo free-kick, they were caught off guard when Owen Hargreaves played an immaculate free-kick over the wall, dipping into the bottom left corner of the goal, leaving Lehmann rooted to his goal line. United continued to press, not giving Arsenal an inch, and though Van der Sar was called on to save a header from Nicklas Bendtner, the Red Devils managed to hold onto their lead and extend their lead at the top of the table. Chelsea, now the only team with a realistic chance of stopping United winning the title failed to reduce the lead to three points the following day, only managing a 1–1 draw at home to Wigan Athletic. They followed this up with a 1–0 win over Everton the following Thursday, reducing the lead to two points with just three games remaining, although United now had a game in hand.

On 19 April, Blackburn Rovers welcomed Manchester United to Ewood Park, where the Red Devils had only managed to win once in their last eight visits. With Chelsea having beaten Everton two days earlier, United went into the game only two points of ahead of the Blues, which meant that defeat against Blackburn would give Chelsea the opportunity to leapfrog United in the teams' meeting the following weekend. Despite a promising start, United fell behind in the 21st minute thanks to a Roque Santa Cruz goal – his 16th of the season. United had dominated large parts of the match, but were unable to make a breakthrough. Finally, with just two minutes left in normal time, Carlos Tevez headed home from Paul Scholes' flick-on to salvage a crucial point for United in the championship race. If United were to beat Chelsea in their next match, they would then require just one point from their remaining two games to secure the title. If they failed to win at Stamford Bridge, however, they would need to win both of their remaining games.

And fail to win they did, losing 2–1 to a Chelsea side that had had an extra day to recuperate from their Champions League tie against Liverpool in mid-week. Coming off the back of a poor display in Barcelona, United were looking to cement their claim to the Premier League title, which would have been all but won with a win over Chelsea. However, with several players rested with Barcelona on Tuesday in mind, and Nemanja Vidić having to be substituted early on after a knee to the face, the odds never looked in United's favour. Owen Hargreaves took Vidić's place in defence, with Wes Brown switching from right-back to centre-back. Joe Cole had the first real chance, but could only smash the ball into the woodwork from 18 yards after he regained the ball from a poor clearance. United held out for 45 minutes, but finally went behind on the stroke of half-time to a Michael Ballack header, after the German had lost his marker to find room at the back post. After the break, United came out a new team, taking the game to Chelsea. After 57 minutes, United conceded a free kick just inside Chelsea's half, but a poor back pass from Ricardo Carvalho allowed Wayne Rooney to pounce on the ball and place a shot beyond Petr Čech into the corner of the net, his first career goal against Chelsea. However, he appeared to have injured himself during his celebration and was soon substituted, making way for Cristiano Ronaldo. The game went quiet for the last 20 minutes, until a Michael Essien cross was handled by Michael Carrick just inside the United penalty area with four minutes left to play. Referee Alan Wiley pointed to the spot, and Ballack stepped up to convert and give Chelsea the win. United went all out for a much needed equaliser, but the closest they came were two shots blocked on the line by Ashley Cole and Andriy Shevchenko. The result brought Chelsea level on points with United with two games to go, United holding on to top spot by virtue of their +53 goal difference. This now meant that United would have to win both of their remaining games to secure the title, provided that Chelsea did not drop any more points.

The first of United's last two games was at home to West Ham United at midday on Saturday, 3 May. Needing the win, United got off to a great start, as Ronaldo put them ahead in the third minute with a deflected shot. 20 minutes later, he got his second of the game and 30th league goal of the season. West Ham failed to deal with Owen Hargreaves' left-footed cross, which dropped onto Ronaldo's thigh and bounced over the line. Former West Ham player Carlos Tevez made it 3–0 in the 26th minute, rifling a 25-yard shot over Robert Green in the Hammers goal. However, Dean Ashton pulled one back for West Ham with an audacious bicycle kick after Wes Brown's clearing header only went straight upwards. Just before half-time, as West Ham were looking to be settling into a rhythm, an altercation between Lucas Neill and Nani resulted in the Portuguese international headbutting the Australian, before going to ground himself, only to find a red card waiting for him when he got back to his feet. This left United a man down, with a whole half left to play. Nevertheless, despite the man advantage, West Ham were unable to capitalise, and ended up going 4–1 down in the 59th minute. Michael Carrick picked the ball up in midfield off a poor West Ham clearance, before letting rip from 30 yards. His shot took a large deflection off Lucas Neill, wrong-footing Robert Green, and the ball nestled in the bottom-left corner of the net. Darren Fletcher also came close to scoring late in the game, after coming on as a substitute, but his shot deflected back off the inside of the post. The match finished 4–1 to United, but Chelsea's win against Newcastle United two days later kept the two teams level on points, meaning that the title race would go to the last day of the season for the first time since 1999.

Manchester United went to Wigan on the final day of the season, knowing that they needed only to equal or better Chelsea's result against Bolton in order to be Premier League champions, due to their superior goal difference. Wayne Rooney was named in the United starting lineup despite concerns over his fitness, while Nemanja Vidić made a return to the side for the first time since his concussion against Chelsea. Wigan started the game with an aggressive mentality, closing down the United players at every opportunity. Paul Scholes was booked early on for a tackle from behind on Wilson Palacios, but the Latics then had a penalty shout turned down in the 24th minute, when a Jason Koumas shot appeared to deflect off Rio Ferdinand's outstretched upper arm. Wigan's anguish was then compounded when referee Steve Bennett awarded United a penalty for Emmerson Boyce's foul on Wayne Rooney. Cristiano Ronaldo stepped up to take the penalty, which he converted, equalling Alan Shearer's record for the most goals in a 38-game season with 31 goals. Soon after, Scholes was fortunate not to be sent off when he cynically brought down Wilson Palacios. Steve Bennett chose to keep his cards in his pocket. In the second half, United continued to test the Wigan goal, but goalkeeper Chris Kirkland was up to the task, producing a number of good saves. Paul Scholes was brought down in the box by Titus Bramble early in the half, but the referee was not positioned well enough to be able to give it. With 25 minutes to go, Alex Ferguson brought on Owen Hargreaves to shore up the defence, and Ryan Giggs, who equalled Bobby Charlton's club appearance record with his 758th appearance in a United shirt. Fittingly, it was Giggs who got United's second goal of the game, slotting the ball past Kirkland after Wayne Rooney played him in with a slide-rule pass. A last-minute equaliser by Bolton against Chelsea at Stamford Bridge ensured that United's championship did not have to be decided by goal difference, and it left the Red Devils as the champions of England for the 17th time, just one short of Liverpool's record of 18 titles.

=== Matches ===
Date	Opponents	H / A	Result F–A	Scorers	Attendance	League position
12 August 2007	Reading	H	0–0		75,655	11th
15 August 2007	Portsmouth	A	1–1	Scholes 15'	20,510	12th
19 August 2007	Manchester City	A	0–1		44,955	17th
26 August 2007	Tottenham Hotspur	H	1–0	Nani 68'	75,696	10th
1 September 2007	Sunderland	H	1–0	Saha 71'	75,648	6th
15 September 2007	Everton	A	1–0	Vidić 83'	39,364	1st
23 September 2007	Chelsea	H	2–0	Tevez 45', Saha 89' (pen.)	75,633	2nd
29 September 2007	Birmingham City	A	1–0	Ronaldo 52'	26,526	2nd
6 October 2007	Wigan Athletic	H	4–0	Tevez 54', Ronaldo (2) 58', 76', Rooney 82'	75,300	1st
20 October 2007	Aston Villa	A	4–1	Rooney (2) 36', 44', Ferdinand 45', Giggs 75'	42,640	2nd
27 October 2007	Middlesbrough	H	4–1	Nani 3', Rooney 33', Tevez (2) 55', 85'	75,720	1st
3 November 2007	Arsenal	A	2–2	Gallas 45' (o.g.), Ronaldo 81'	60,161	2nd
11 November 2007	Blackburn Rovers	H	2–0	Ronaldo (2) 34', 35'	75,710	1st
24 November 2007	Bolton Wanderers	A	0–1		25,028	2nd
3 December 2007	Fulham	H	2–0	Ronaldo (2) 10', 58'	75,055	2nd
8 December 2007	Derby County	H	4–1	Giggs 41', Tevez (2) 45', 61', Ronaldo 90+2' (pen.)	75,725	2nd
16 December 2007	Liverpool	A	1–0	Tevez 43'	44,459	2nd
23 December 2007	Everton	H	2–1	Ronaldo (2) 22', 88' (pen.)	75,749	2nd
26 December 2007	Sunderland	A	4–0	Rooney 20', Saha (2) 30', 85' (pen.), Ronaldo 45'	47,360	1st
29 December 2007	West Ham United	A	1–2	Ronaldo 14'	34,966	2nd
1 January 2008	Birmingham City	H	1–0	Tevez 25'	75,459	2nd
12 January 2008	Newcastle United	H	6–0	Ronaldo (3) 49', 70', 88', Tevez (2) 55', 90', Ferdinand 85'	75,965	1st
19 January 2008	Reading	A	2–0	Rooney 77', Ronaldo 90'	24,135	1st
30 January 2008	Portsmouth	H	2–0	Ronaldo (2) 10', 12'	75,415	1st
2 February 2008	Tottenham Hotspur	A	1–1	Tevez 90'	36,075	2nd
10 February 2008	Manchester City	H	1–2	Carrick 90'	75,970	2nd
23 February 2008	Newcastle United	A	5–1	Rooney (2) 25', 80', Ronaldo (2) 45', 56', Saha 90'	52,291	2nd
1 March 2008	Fulham	A	3–0	Hargreaves 14', Park 45', Davies 72' (o.g.)	25,314	2nd
15 March 2008	Derby County	A	1–0	Ronaldo 76'	33,072	1st
19 March 2008	Bolton Wanderers	H	2–0	Ronaldo (2) 9', 20'	75,476	1st
23 March 2008	Liverpool	H	3–0	Brown 34', Ronaldo 79', Nani 81'	76,000	1st
29 March 2008	Aston Villa	H	4–0	Ronaldo 16', Tevez 33', Rooney (2) 53', 70'	75,932	1st
6 April 2008	Middlesbrough	A	2–2	Ronaldo 10', Rooney 74'	33,952	1st
13 April 2008	Arsenal	H	2–1	Ronaldo 53' (pen.), Hargreaves 72'	75,985	1st
19 April 2008	Blackburn Rovers	A	1–1	Tevez 88'	30,316	1st
26 April 2008	Chelsea	A	1–2	Rooney 57'	41,828	1st
3 May 2008	West Ham United	H	4–1	Ronaldo (2) 3', 24', Tevez 26', Carrick 59'	76,013	1st
11 May 2008	Wigan Athletic	A	2–0	Ronaldo 33' (pen.), Giggs 80'	25,133	1st

Pos	Team	Pld	W	D	L	GF	GA	GD	Pts	Qualification or relegation
1	Manchester United (C)	38	27	6	5	80	22	+58	87	Qualification for the Champions League group stage
2	Chelsea	38	25	10	3	65	26	+39	85	Qualification for the Champions League group stage
3	Arsenal	38	24	11	3	74	31	+43	83	Qualification for the Champions League third qualifying round
4	Liverpool	38	21	13	4	67	28	+39	76	Qualification for the Champions League third qualifying round
5	Everton	38	19	8	11	55	33	+22	65	Qualification for the UEFA Cup first round

Source: Barclays Premier League
Rules for classification: 1) points; 2) goal difference; 3) number of goals scored.
For further information on European qualification see Premier League – Competition
(C) Champions

== FA Cup ==
In the third round draw, United were paired with Aston Villa for the fourth time in seven years. The match was played at Villa Park on 5 January 2008, United winning 2–0 with goals from Cristiano Ronaldo and Wayne Rooney. United were given a home draw against Tottenham Hotspur in the Fourth Round and won the game 3–1. After going a goal down to a Robbie Keane strike, United drew level with Carlos Tevez, before Cristiano Ronaldo scored the other two goals; one a penalty after Michael Dawson was sent off for a deliberate handball.

The Fifth Round draw was held on 28 January 2008, with United facing the possibility of drawing one of five other Premier League clubs, including Arsenal, Chelsea and Liverpool. As it was, United drew Arsenal, pitting the current top two teams in the Premier League against each other in the only all-Premier League tie of the round. The match was played on 16 February 2008, with United running out as 4–0 winners, the goals coming from Rooney, Darren Fletcher (2), and Nani.

The draw for the Sixth Round took place on 18 February 2008, and drew United at home against Portsmouth. The tie, which was the only all-Premier League tie of the round, was played on 8 March 2008. United went into the game with the prospect of another Treble still on the cards, and started the match full of confidence. However, when the referee, Martin Atkinson, failed to award the Red Devils a penalty in the seventh minute after Sylvain Distin clearly bodychecked Cristiano Ronaldo, it was clear that it was not to be United's day. United continued to produce the better of the chances in the first half – Portsmouth's best effort was a swerving 25-yarder from Pedro Mendes that tested Van der Sar to the extent that the Dutch keeper injured himself and had to be substituted at half-time.

United's chances continued to flow thick and fast. Michael Carrick rounded the goalkeeper only to be tackled on the line by Distin, whilst Patrice Evra had a shot turned onto the post by David James before things went from bad to worse for the Manchester side. With 12 minutes to play, Portsmouth counter-attacked down the right hand side, forcing a two-on-two situation. The ball was squared to Milan Baroš, who was felled by Kuszczak in the box. The referee had no hesitation in sending Kuszczak off, despite both Rooney and Anderson having gotten back behind the ball before the foul. Nevertheless, referee Atkinson's decision meant that United had no recognised goalkeeper available for the remaining time. Wayne Rooney offered his services, but that would have left United without a recognised centre-forward, so Rio Ferdinand was given the responsibility of attempting to save the penalty. However, although he dived the right way, Ferdinand was unable to get a hand to the ball, and Sulley Muntari gave Portsmouth the lead. United fought hard to get their deserved equaliser, but even Ronaldo's free kick was off-target, and United were knocked out of the FA Cup.

Date	Round	Opponents	H / A	Result F–A	Scorers	Attendance
5 January 2008	Round 3	Aston Villa	A	2–0	Ronaldo 81', Rooney 89'	33,630
27 January 2008	Round 4	Tottenham Hotspur	H	3–1	Tevez 38', Ronaldo (2) 69' (pen.), 88'	75,369
16 February 2008	Round 5	Arsenal	H	4–0	Rooney 16', Fletcher (2) 20', 74', Nani 38'	75,550
8 March 2008	Round 6	Portsmouth	H	0–1		75,463

== League Cup ==
United played their only League Cup game of the season when they lost 2–0 at home to Coventry City, both goals scored by Michael Mifsud. Two players – Jonny Evans and Danny Simpson – made their first team debuts in the match, while a further six players made their first starts of the season.

Date	Round	Opponents	H / A	Result F–A	Scorers	Attendance
26 September 2007	Round 3	Coventry City	H	0–2		74,055

== UEFA Champions League ==
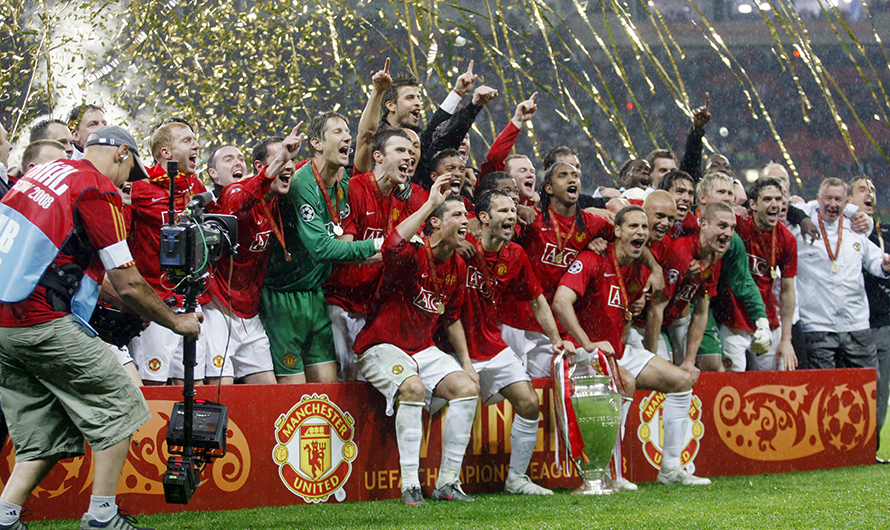
Manchester United won the UEFA Champions League for the third time in the 2007–08 season.

=== Group stage ===
United were drawn into a group with Sporting CP, the previous club of Cristiano Ronaldo and new signing Nani, Dynamo Kyiv, and Roma, who suffered a huge 7–1 loss to the Red Devils in the 2006–07 season. United started their Champions League campaign with a 1–0 win against Sporting, which they followed up with another 1–0 win, this time against Roma. United's winning streak in Europe continued when they won their match against Dynamo Kyiv 4–2 in Ukraine, with goals coming from Rio Ferdinand, Wayne Rooney and Cristiano Ronaldo (2). United sealed their place in the knockout stage with a 4–0 win in the return game against Dynamo Kyiv, with goals from Carlos Tevez, Wayne Rooney and Cristiano Ronaldo, while Gerard Piqué got his first ever senior goal for the club.

The team went into the next game against Sporting knowing that a win would secure top spot for them. However, they went 1–0 down after just 21 minutes through an unexpected goal from Abel Ferreira. It took United another 40 minutes to get an equaliser, as Carlos Tevez scored a scrappy goal in the 61st minute. Just when it looked like United were about to settle for a draw, they won a free kick in the 92nd minute. Up stepped Cristiano Ronaldo, who lashed the free kick into the far top corner of the net to win the match 2–1. That left the final game in the group without consequence, and so Sir Alex took a youthful squad with him to Rome, including six players yet to make their senior debuts for the club. Although none of the six made the starting line-up, it was another of United's youth players, Piqué, who scored the opening goal in the 34th minute. However, the Reds were denied maximum points from the group stage by a 71st-minute goal from Mancini. Nevertheless, the 16 points they did pick up in the six games was the most of any team in the group stage.

Date	Opponents	H / A	Result F–A	Scorers	Attendance	Group position
19 September 2007	Sporting CP	A	1–0	Ronaldo 62'	41,510	2nd
2 October 2007	Roma	H	1–0	Rooney 70'	73,652	1st
23 October 2007	Dynamo Kyiv	A	4–2	Ferdinand 10', Rooney 18', Ronaldo (2) 41', 68' (pen.)	42,000	1st
7 November 2007	Dynamo Kyiv	H	4–0	Piqué 31', Tevez 37', Rooney 76', Ronaldo 88'	75,017	1st
27 November 2007	Sporting CP	H	2–1	Tevez 61', Ronaldo 90+2'	75,162	1st
12 December 2007	Roma	A	1–1	Piqué 34'	29,490	1st

Pos	Team	Pld	W	D	L	GF	GA	GD	Pts	Qualification
1	(England) Manchester United	6	5	1	0	13	4	+9	16	Advance to knockout stage
2	(Italy) Roma	6	3	2	1	11	6	+5	11	Advance to knockout stage
3	(Portugal) Sporting CP	6	2	1	3	9	8	+1	7	Transfer to UEFA Cup
4	(Ukraine) Dynamo Kyiv	6	0	0	6	4	19	−15	0	

Source: RSSSF

=== Knockout phase ===
==== First knockout round ====
The first knockout round draw took place on 21 December, and paired Manchester United with Lyon of France. The last (and only) time United were paired with Lyon was in the group stage of the 2004–05 UEFA Champions League, in which the away tie finished as a 2–2 draw, while United won the home leg 2–1. The away leg was played on 20 February, and saw Lyon go 1–0 up in the 54th minute, through a Karim Benzema shot that went in off the post. Carlos Tevez rectified the situation in the 87th minute, pulling United level to make sure that the Red Devils were in half-decent shape for the return leg on 4 March.

Manchester United started the second leg brightly, probing the Lyon defence for gaps, but to no avail as Lyon gradually fought their way back into the game, knowing they had to score at least once to qualify for the quarter-finals. However, as half-time approached, Wes Brown made an overlapping run, before delivering a cross that found its way to Anderson on the edge of the area. The Brazilian side-footed the ball goalwards, and the ball broke to Cristiano Ronaldo who fired the ball home from an ever-narrowing angle. However, no more goals were to come, Lyon's Kader Keïta coming the closest as he hit the post in the 74th minute. Nevertheless, United qualified for the quarter-finals, the first leg to be played on either 1 April or 2 April.

==== Quarter-final ====
The draw for the quarter-finals, semi-finals and final of the Champions League was held on 14 March 2008. Despite English teams making up half of the numbers in the draw, United were drawn with Roma. This tie would see the fifth and sixth times that the Red Devils had played against their Italian opponents in the last 12 months; the previous four matches resulted in two wins, a draw and a loss, including United's Champions League record 7–1 win in the 2006–07 quarter-final. The winner of this quarter-final would meet either Schalke or Barcelona in the semi-finals, before facing Arsenal, Liverpool, Fenerbahçe or Chelsea in the final, setting up the prospect of an all-English final.

The first leg of United's quarter-final against Roma was played at the Stadio Olimpico on 1 April 2008. Ryan Giggs started the match on the bench, which meant that Rio Ferdinand was handed the captaincy and Park Ji-sung was given his first Champions League appearance of the season, while Michael Carrick was able to take his position in the midfield three despite having missed the team's training session the day before. The match started fairly evenly, but it was Roma who had the first meaningful attempt on goal, with Christian Panucci heading just over from a corner. On the half-hour, United's defence suffered a major setback as Nemanja Vidić fell awkwardly after jumping for a header. His place in central defence was taken by John O'Shea. Nevertheless, with just five minutes of the half remaining, the ball broke to Paul Scholes on the right hand side of the Roma penalty area. With his options limited, he played a ball at head-height into the centre of the penalty area, where Cristiano Ronaldo, who had just run full speed from near the centre circle, was ready to power a header past Roma keeper Doni. Buoyed by the cushion of the away goal, United started the second half confidently, prising a desperate Roma side apart with crisp passing along the floor. On the hour mark, in response to a header on goal by Mirko Vučinić that brought about a world class save from Edwin van der Sar, Alex Ferguson called for his team to adopt a more conservative formation, bringing on Owen Hargreaves to replace Anderson. United seemed more comfortable playing in a 4–4–2 formation, and the change paid immediate dividends, as Rooney pounced on Doni's mishandling of Park's header to poke the ball home for 2–0. The Reds continued to threaten, but were forced to defend well to prevent Roma from taking any goals with them to Old Trafford. The match finished 2–0, putting United in a comfortable position going into the second leg on 9 April.

United went into the second leg with a couple of injury concerns in the centre of their defence. Nemanja Vidić was still carrying an injury from the first leg, while Rio Ferdinand had a suspected foot injury that he picked up in the Reds' match against Middlesbrough at the weekend. Nevertheless, Ferdinand was deemed to be fit enough to start the match, and lined up alongside Gerard Piqué in the centre of defence. Mikaël Silvestre also found a place in the starting lineup, making his first start for nearly seven months, following a knee ligament injury, and Gary Neville also made a return to the first team squad, being selected on the bench. Meanwhile, Cristiano Ronaldo, Wayne Rooney and Paul Scholes were left on the bench, as Alex Ferguson obviously had an eye on the following weekend's match against Arsenal. Manchester United started the match brightly, creating numerous opportunities in the first few minutes. However, on the half-hour, the referee Tom Henning Øvrebø awarded the visiting side a penalty for a trip on Mancini by Wes Brown, which Daniele De Rossi stepped up to take. Live action replays however showed no contact between Brown and Mancini. The Italian midfielder blazed the ball over the crossbar, wasting what would end up being Roma's best chance of getting back into the tie.

Roma started the second half strongly, creating a couple of chances in the first 15 minutes of the second half, including a Rodrigo Taddei effort that forced a last-ditch block from Mikaël Silvestre. Still, United weathered the early storm and, with 20 minutes of the match to go, put the tie beyond reasonable doubt through Carlos Tevez. The Argentinian powered past a pair of Roma defenders, before playing the ball to Owen Hargreaves on the right wing. Tevez continued his run into the box, before finishing with a glancing header off Hargreaves' inch-perfect cross. The day was made complete in the 81st minute, when Alex Ferguson brought Anderson off to be replaced by Gary Neville, who immediately took over the captaincy, albeit in central midfield, rather than his preferred right-back slot. Neville's every touch was greeted with cheers from the United fans, who had had to wait 13 months for their captain to take to the field again after a succession of injuries. Park Ji-sung had an effort saved late on, but the match was concluded soon after, and United could now look forward to their semi-final first leg away to Barcelona on 23 April. Barcelona were the only team other than United to remain unbeaten in the Champions League up to the semi-finals this season. The win over Roma was the 11th consecutive home victory in the Champions League for United, setting a new record for the competition.

==== Semi-final ====
Both teams went into the semi-final first leg with identical records in this season's Champions League, each having won eight games and drawn two, while scoring 18 goals and conceding five. United were awarded a penalty three minutes into the game, after Gabriel Milito handled Cristiano Ronaldo's header from a corner. Ronaldo himself stepped up to take the kick, but, despite sending Víctor Valdés the wrong way, smacked his shot against the post. The missed penalty seemed to give Barcelona the extra impetus they needed, and they began to take control of the game. Just before the half-hour, Ronaldo made a break into the Barça penalty area, only to be bodychecked by Rafael Márquez, who made no attempt to get to the ball. Rightfully expecting another penalty to be awarded, the look of dismay on Ronaldo's face was justified when he saw referee Massimo Busacca wave play on. Márquez fouled Ronaldo again just before half time, this time about 25 yards from goal. Márquez was shown a yellow card for his trouble, which meant he was ineligible for the second leg on 29 April, but Ronaldo saw his resulting free kick go just a yard wide of the far post. A number of saves from Van der Sar and a Michael Carrick block kept Barcelona at bay, while Carrick himself came close to scoring at the other end, rippling the side-netting after making space for himself on the left side of the penalty area. The match finished as a scoreless draw, with Barcelona having had the better of the possession, but with the second leg being played at Old Trafford, United had every reason to be confident.

During the second leg, Old Trafford hosted a very emotive night in which the home crowd vociferously supported United as they worked to achieve a place in the final. Following a shaky start (including Paul Scholes fouling Lionel Messi on the very edge of the penalty area within the first 45 seconds), United took the lead courtesy of an outstanding goal by Paul Scholes in the 14th minute. Despite surrendering huge swathes of possession to Barcelona, United nearly extended their lead shortly before half time, Nani heading wide from a good cross from Park Ji-sung. The second half of the match saw a challenging Barcelona that simply failed to get a vital away goal, mostly thanks to a very good defensive work by the Red Devils, the game ending 1–0. The win increased the number of consecutive home wins in the Champions League to a record 12, the previous record having stood at 10, and qualified United for their third European Cup final. With Chelsea beating Liverpool in the other semi-final, it set up the European Cup's first ever all-English final, to be played at the Luzhniki Stadium in Moscow on 21 May 2008.

==== Final ====
United had the run of the play in the first half of the final, dominating Chelsea in terms of possession, and took the lead in the 26th minute through a Cristiano Ronaldo header off a Wes Brown cross. However, in the last minute of the first half, a ball into the United box was deflected to Frank Lampard, who capitalised on a slip by Van der Sar to equalise for the Londoners. The second half was much more even, but no further goals were scored and the match went to extra time. Midway through the second half of extra time, a large incident involving Carlos Tevez and John Terry kicked off. In the ensuing melée, the referee spotted a slap on Nemanja Vidić by Didier Drogba, and had no hesitation in sending the Ivorian international off. Despite the man advantage, United were unable to find a winner and the match went to penalties. Both teams converted their first two penalties, but then the most unlikely of players missed his – Cristiano Ronaldo, who stepped up with his usual self-confidence, could only stare on as Petr Čech saved his shot. Just when the match looked lost, John Terry stepped up for the Blues, only for his standing foot to give way as he struck his shot and the ball hit the post. This took the match to sudden death penalties, though only two further rounds were required. Ryan Giggs scored United's seventh penalty, meaning that Nicolas Anelka had to score in order to keep Chelsea in the game. His shot, however, was poorly struck, and at the perfect height for United's Dutch goalkeeper to save, granting United their third European Cup title.

Date	Round	Opponents	H / A	Result F–A	Scorers	Attendance
20 February 2008	First knockout round First leg	Lyon	A	1–1	Tevez 87'	39,219
4 March 2008	First knockout round Second leg	Lyon	H	1–0	Ronaldo 41'	75,520
1 April 2008	Quarter-finals; First leg	Roma	A	2–0	Ronaldo 39', Rooney 66'	60,931
9 April 2008	Quarter-finals; Second leg	Roma	H	1–0	Tevez 70'	74,423
23 April 2008	Semi-finals; First leg	Barcelona	A	0–0		95,949
29 April 2008	Semi-finals; Second leg	Barcelona	H	1–0	Scholes 14'	75,061
21 May 2008	Final	Chelsea	N	1–1 (6–5p)	Ronaldo 25'	67,310

== Squad statistics ==
No.	Pos.	Name	League		FA Cup		League Cup		Europe		Other		Total		Discipline	
No.	Pos.	Name	Apps	Goals	Apps	Goals	Apps	Goals	Apps	Goals	Apps	Goals	Apps	Goals	Yellow card	Red card
1	GK	(Netherlands) Edwin van der Sar	29	0	4	0	0	0	10	0	1	0	44	0	3	0
2	DF	(England) Gary Neville (c)	0	0	0	0	0	0	0(1)	0	0	0	0(1)	0	0	0
3	DF	(France) Patrice Evra	33	0	4	0	0	0	10	0	1	0	48	0	6	0
4	MF	(England) Owen Hargreaves	16(7)	2	2(1)	0	0	0	5(3)	0	0	0	23(11)	2	3	0
5	DF	(England) Rio Ferdinand	35	2	4	0	0	0	11	1	1	0	51	3	5	0
6	DF	(England) Wes Brown	34(2)	1	4	0	0(1)	0	9(1)	0	1	0	48(4)	1	8	0
7	MF	(Portugal) Cristiano Ronaldo	31(3)	31	3	3	0	0	11	8	1	0	46(3)	42	7	1
8	MF	(Brazil) Anderson	16(8)	0	2(2)	0	1	0	6(3)	0	0	0	25(13)	0	3	0
9	FW	(France) Louis Saha	6(11)	5	1(1)	0	0	0	3(2)	0	0	0	10(14)	5	0	0
10	FW	(England) Wayne Rooney	25(2)	12	3(1)	2	0	0	10(1)	4	1	0	39(4)	18	12	0
11	MF	(Wales) Ryan Giggs (vc)	26(5)	3	2	0	0	0	4(5)	0	1	1	33(10)	4	1	0
12	GK	(England) Ben Foster	1	0	0	0	0	0	0	0	0	0	1	0	0	0
13	MF	(South Korea) Park Ji-sung	8(4)	1	2	0	0	0	4	0	0	0	14(4)	1	0	0
14	DF	(Argentina) Gabriel Heinze	0	0	0	0	0	0	0	0	0	0	0	0	0	0
15	DF	(Serbia) Nemanja Vidić	32	1	3	0	0	0	9	0	1	0	45	1	6	0
16	MF	(England) Michael Carrick	24(7)	2	3(1)	0	0(1)	0	11(1)	0	1	0	39(10)	2	3	0
17	MF	(Portugal) Nani	16(10)	3	2	1	1	0	7(4)	0	0(1)	0	26(15)	4	4	1
18	MF	(England) Paul Scholes	22(2)	1	1(2)	0	0	0	7	1	0	0	30(4)	2	4	0
19	DF	(Spain) Gerard Piqué	5(4)	0	0	0	1	0	3	2	0	0	9(4)	2	1	0
20	FW	(Norway) Ole Gunnar Solskjær	0	0	0	0	0	0	0	0	0	0	0	0	0	0
21	FW	(China) Dong Fangzhuo	0	0	0	0	1	0	0(1)	0	0	0	1(1)	0	0	0
22	DF	(Republic of Ireland) John O'Shea	10(18)	0	1(1)	0	1	0	4(2)	0	1	0	17(21)	0	1	0
23	DF	(Northern Ireland) Jonny Evans	0	0	0	0	1	0	1(1)	0	0	0	2(1)	0	0	0
24	MF	(Scotland) Darren Fletcher	5(11)	0	1	2	0	0	5(1)	0	0(1)	0	11(13)	2	3	0
25	DF	(England) Danny Simpson	1(2)	0	0(1)	0	1	0	2(1)	0	0	0	4(4)	0	0	0
26	DF	(England) Phil Bardsley	0	0	0	0	1	0	0	0	0	0	1	0	0	0
27	DF	(France) Mikaël Silvestre	3	0	0	0	0	0	1(1)	0	1	0	5(1)	0	0	0
28	MF	(Republic of Ireland) Darron Gibson	0	0	0	0	0	0	0	0	0	0	0	0	0	0
29	GK	(Poland) Tomasz Kuszczak	8(1)	0	0(1)	0	1	0	3(2)	0	0	0	12(4)	0	0	1
30	MF	(England) Lee Martin	0	0	0	0	1	0	0	0	0	0	1	0	0	0
32	FW	(Argentina) Carlos Tevez	31(3)	14	2	1	0	0	6(6)	4	0	0	39(9)	19	2	0
33	MF	(England) Chris Eagles	1(3)	0	0	0	1	0	1	0	0	0	3(3)	0	0	0
34	MF	(Brazil) Rodrigo Possebon	0	0	0	0	0	0	0	0	0	0	0	0	0	0
35	MF	(England) Kieran Lee	0	0	0	0	0	0	0	0	0	0	0	0	0	0
36	DF	(Scotland) David Gray	0	0	0	0	0	0	0	0	0	0	0	0	0	0
38	GK	(England) Tom Heaton	0	0	0	0	0	0	0	0	0	0	0	0	0	0
39	FW	(England) Fraizer Campbell	0(1)	0	0	0	0(1)	0	0	0	0	0	0(2)	0	0	0
40	DF	(England) Adam Eckersley	0	0	0	0	0	0	0	0	0	0	0	0	0	0
43	MF	(England) Sam Hewson	0	0	0	0	0	0	0	0	0	0	0	0	0	0
45	FW	(England) Febian Brandy	0	0	0	0	0	0	0	0	0	0	0	0	0	0
46	DF	(England) Richard Eckersley	0	0	0	0	0	0	0	0	0	0	0	0	0	0
47	FW	(England) Danny Welbeck	0	0	0	0	0	0	0	0	0	0	0	0	0	0

== Transfers ==
United's first departure of the 2007–08 season was Kieran Richardson, who signed for Sunderland on 16 July for an undisclosed fee. Fifteen days later, Giuseppe Rossi also left the club, signing for Villarreal. On 3 August, Alan Smith departed for Newcastle United, and almost three weeks later, Gabriel Heinze left for Real Madrid. Five days later, club legend Ole Gunnar Solskjær retired at the age of 34.

Coming in during the summer transfer window were Owen Hargreaves, who left Bayern Munich on 1 July. The following day, Anderson and Nani signed for a combined £47.5 million. On the same day that Anderson and Nani arrived, Polish goalkeeper Tomasz Kuszczak came in from West Bromwich Albion, having already spent the previous season with Manchester United on loan.

During the winter transfer window, Adam Eckersley, Ryan Shawcross, and Phil Bardsley departed, while in May, Kieran Lee and Gerard Piqué left the club.

United's winter arrivals were Angolan forward Manucho and Brazilian midfielder Rodrigo Possebon. Italian youngster Davide Petrucci arrived in June from Roma.

=== In ===
Date	Pos.	Name	From	Fee
1 July 2007	MF	(England) Owen Hargreaves	(Germany) Bayern Munich	Undisclosed
2 July 2007	MF	(Brazil) Anderson	(Portugal) Porto	£30m (combined)
2 July 2007	MF	(Portugal) Nani	(Portugal) Sporting CP	£30m (combined)
2 July 2007	GK	(Poland) Tomasz Kuszczak	(England) West Bromwich Albion	£2.125m
1 January 2008	FW	(Angola) Manucho	(Angola) Petro Atlético	Undisclosed
30 January 2008	MF	(Brazil) Rodrigo Possebon	(Brazil) Internacional	Undisclosed
13 June 2008	FW	(Italy) Davide Petrucci	(Italy) Roma	£200k

=== Out ===
Date	Pos.	Name	To	Fee
1 July 2007	GK	(United States) Tim Howard	(England) Everton	£3.1m
16 July 2007	MF	(England) Kieran Richardson	(England) Sunderland	Undisclosed
31 July 2007	FW	(Italy) Giuseppe Rossi	(Spain) Villarreal	Undisclosed
3 August 2007	FW	(England) Alan Smith	(England) Newcastle United	£6m
23 August 2007	DF	(Argentina) Gabriel Heinze	(Spain) Real Madrid	Undisclosed
28 August 2007	FW	(Norway) Ole Gunnar Solskjær	Retired	
1 January 2008	DF	(England) Adam Eckersley	(England) Port Vale	Free
17 January 2008	DF	(Wales) Ryan Shawcross	(England) Stoke City	£1m
22 January 2008	DF	(England) Phil Bardsley	(England) Sunderland	£2m
21 May 2008	DF	(England) Kieran Lee	(England) Oldham Athletic	Free
27 May 2008	DF	(Spain) Gerard Piqué	(Spain) Barcelona	Undisclosed

=== Loan in ===
Date from	Date to	Position	Name	From
10 August 2007	31 July 2009	FW	(Argentina) Carlos Tevez	MSI

=== Loan out ===
Date from	Date to	Position	Name	To
9 August 2007	31 January 2008	DF	(Wales) Ryan Shawcross	(England) Stoke City
14 August 2007	31 December 2007	MF	(England) Ritchie Jones	(England) Yeovil Town
29 August 2007	1 January 2008	DF	(Northern Ireland) Craig Cathcart	(Belgium) Royal Antwerp
31 August 2007	1 January 2008	DF	(England) Michael Lea	(Belgium) Royal Antwerp
5 October 2007	5 January 2008	MF	(England) Lee Martin	(England) Plymouth Argyle
12 October 2007	8 November 2007	DF	(England) Adam Eckersley	(England) Port Vale
19 October 2007	19 January 2008	DF	(England) Phil Bardsley	(England) Sheffield United
19 October 2007	30 June 2008	FW	(England) Fraizer Campbell	(England) Hull City
19 October 2007	30 June 2008	MF	(Republic of Ireland) Darron Gibson	(England) Wolverhampton Wanderers
22 November 2007	19 December 2007	DF	(Scotland) David Gray	(England) Crewe Alexandra
2 January 2008	30 June 2008	DF	(England) Kieran Lee	(England) Queens Park Rangers
3 January 2008	30 June 2008	MF	(England) Michael Barnes	(England) Chesterfield
4 January 2008	31 May 2008	DF	(Northern Ireland) Jonny Evans	(England) Sunderland
10 January 2008	30 June 2008	MF	(England) Lee Martin	(England) Sheffield United
17 January 2008	30 June 2008	FW	(England) Febian Brandy	(Wales) Swansea City
31 January 2008	30 June 2008	FW	(Angola) Manucho	(Greece) Panathinaikos
21 March 2008	27 May 2008	DF	(England) Danny Simpson	(England) Ipswich Town
27 March 2008	3 May 2008	MF	(England) Michael Barnes	(England) Shrewsbury Town
