= John O'Shea =

Irish footballer & coach (born 1981)

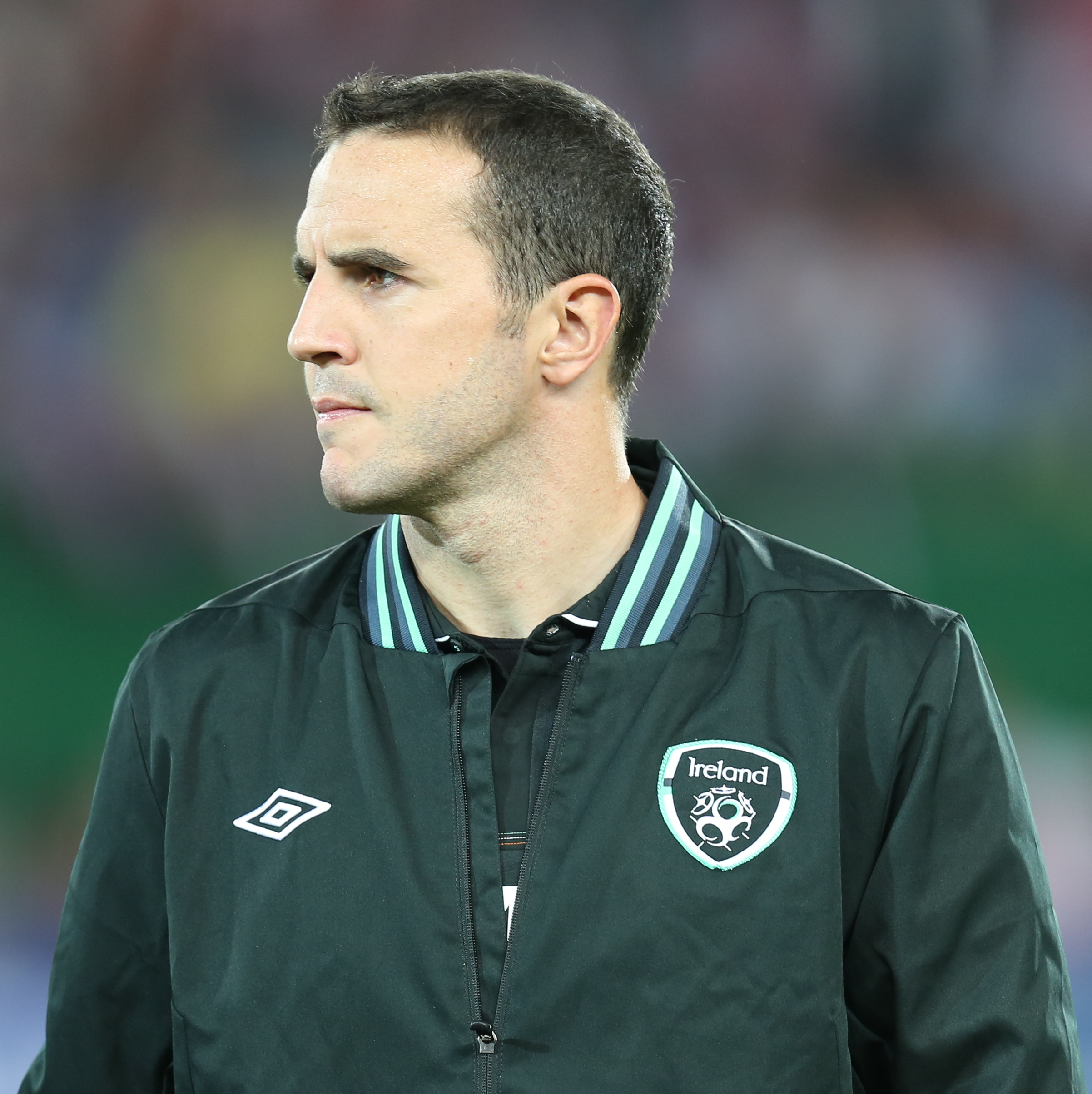
- O'Shea lining up for the Republic of Ireland in 2013

Personal information
- Full name: John Francis O'Shea
- Date of birth: 30 April 1981 (age 45)
- Place of birth: Waterford, Ireland
- Height: 1.91 m (6 ft 3 in)
- Positions: Defender; defensive midfielder

Team information
- Current team: Republic of Ireland (assistant manager)

Youth career
- 1989–1995: Ferrybank AFC
- 1995–1998: Waterford Bohemians
- 1998–1999: Manchester United

Senior career*
Years	Team	Apps	(Gls)
1999–2011	Manchester United	256	(10)
2000	→ AFC Bournemouth (loan)	10	(1)
2000–2001	→ Royal Antwerp (loan)	14	(0)
2011–2018	Sunderland	226	(4)
2018–2019	Reading	9	(0)
Total		515	(15)

International career
1998	Republic of Ireland U16		
2000–2002	Republic of Ireland U21	13	(1)
2001–2018	Republic of Ireland	118	(3)

Managerial career
- 2024: Republic of Ireland (caretaker)
Medal record
Representing Republic of Ireland
UEFA European Under-16 Championship
Winner	1998 Scotland
- * Club domestic league appearances and goals

John Francis O'Shea (/oʊˈʃeɪ/; born 30 April 1981) is an Irish professional football coach and former player who is currently assistant manager of the Republic of Ireland men's national team. He was known for his versatility in playing several defensive and midfield positions on either side of the pitch or the centre. With 14 winners' medals, he is one of the most decorated Irish footballers of all time; only Denis Irwin, Roy Keane, Steve Heighway and Ronnie Whelan have accrued more honours.

Born in Waterford and growing up in Ferrybank, O'Shea joined Manchester United when he was 17. He spent loan spells at AFC Bournemouth and Royal Antwerp before establishing himself in the Manchester United first team, going on to make 393 appearances and scoring 15 times in all competitions across 12 seasons. He won five Premier League titles, one FA Cup, two Football League Cups, four FA Community Shields, the FIFA Club World Cup and the UEFA Champions League with the club. He joined Sunderland in July 2011. Having played 256 times for the Wearside club and scoring four goals, he signed for Championship side Reading in July 2018. Retiring in May 2019, he joined that club's coaching staff that summer, before leaving in the summer of 2021. He then coached at Stoke City and Birmingham City.

O'Shea made his Republic of Ireland debut in 2001 against Croatia and made 118 appearances for his national team over the next 17 years, scoring three goals, his first in 2003 against Australia. He was part of the team that controversially lost to France in a play-off for the 2010 FIFA World Cup and went on to play in UEFA Euro 2012 and UEFA Euro 2016. He then served as assistant manager on the under-21 and senior teams, as well as interim manager of the latter in 2024.

== Club career ==
=== Manchester United ===
==== 1999–2006 ====
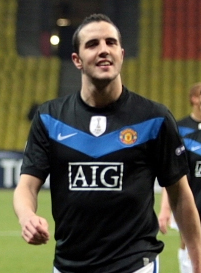
O'Shea with Manchester United

Before joining the Manchester United academy, O'Shea played for Ferrybank AFC and Waterford Bohemians. He signed professional forms at the age of 17 and made his professional debut on 13 October 1999 against Aston Villa at Villa Park in a 3–0 Football League Cup defeat.

In January 2000, O'Shea was loaned to AFC Bournemouth in the Football League Second Division. He played 11 total games for the Cherries and scored once in the third minute of a 3–1 loss at Millwall on 19 February. After a loan to Belgian side Royal Antwerp, he returned to Manchester and began to feature in the United first team in the 2002–03 season, demonstrating versatility by playing at left-back, right-back, centre-back and central midfield during the successful 2002–03 Premier League campaign.

In 2003–04, United were without Rio Ferdinand after he began a suspension for missing a drugs test in January, and O'Shea took over from Ferdinand in central defence, helping United reach the FA Cup final where they triumphed 3–0 over Millwall.

He displayed indifferent form in the 2004–05 season and was linked with a move away from Manchester, with Newcastle United and Liverpool being linked with the Irishman. One of the highlights of Manchester United's otherwise slightly disappointing season was the 4–2 away victory against Arsenal, in which O'Shea scored the fourth goal by chipping Arsenal goalkeeper Manuel Almunia from the edge of the 18-yard box.

An injury to Gary Neville in the 2005–06 season also gave O'Shea more first-team opportunities. He was criticised for his lacklustre performances that season, and was reportedly one of the players lambasted by United veteran Roy Keane in a controversial interview on the club's MUTV channel.

==== 2007–2011 ====
On 4 February 2007, during a league game against Tottenham Hotspur, O'Shea deputised for Edwin van der Sar in goal after Van der Sar was taken off the pitch for a broken nose, while Manchester United had already used all three substitutes. During this time, he denied his Republic of Ireland teammate Robbie Keane a goal with a save a few minutes before full-time. Following this incident, United fans chanted "Ireland's number one" in O'Shea's honour.

A month later, he won over many United fans by scoring a stoppage-time winner against Liverpool at Anfield for United in the league, having come on as a substitute for Wayne Rooney. This goal was important in United going on to regain the Premier League trophy for the 2006–07 season. He also rescued his team against Everton in one of the final games of the season, when he bundled the ball into the net after Everton goalkeeper Iain Turner fumbled a Ryan Giggs corner. United went on to win 4–2. This was perhaps an even more decisive goal, as Bolton Wanderers were drawing with Chelsea at the same time and defeat would have let Chelsea back into the title race. He scored another goal from close range, in a 2–1 defeat away to Portsmouth that season, this goal came during an injury-hit part of the season, where O'Shea, as a versatile player, was required to play at full-back. O'Shea had a shooting accuracy of 100% and scored with 80% of his shots in the 2006–07 season.

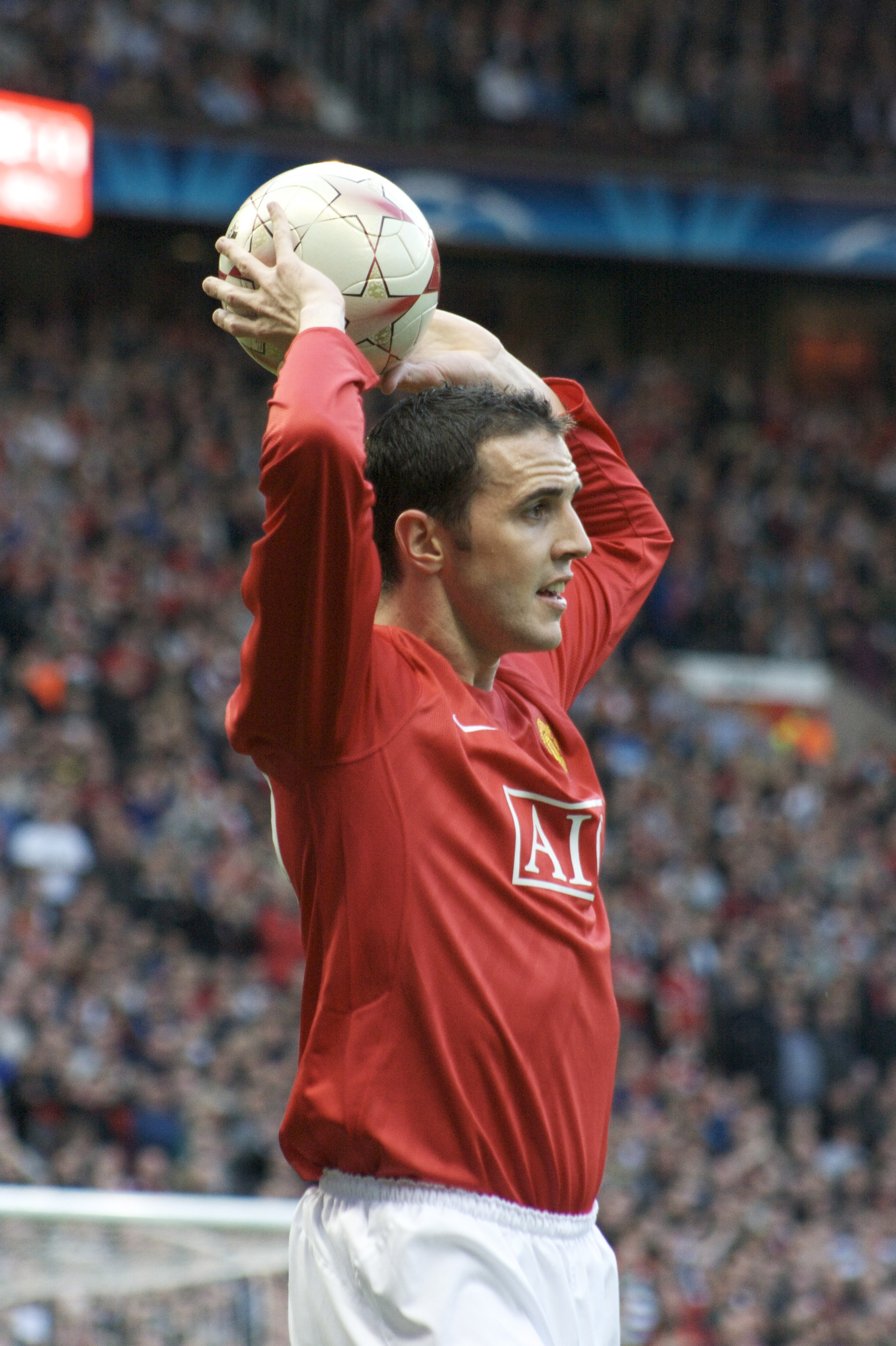
O'Shea playing in the 2008–09 UEFA Champions League semi-final against Arsenal when he helped his team to the 2009 UEFA Champions League final

During the 2007–08 season, Manchester United used O'Shea as an emergency striker due to injury problems. His use as a striker gave him the distinction of having played in every position for Manchester United. In November 2007, O'Shea extended his contract at Manchester United, to keep him at the club until 2012. Throughout the 2007–08 season, O'Shea came off the bench several times as United won a Premier League and Champions League double. O'Shea captained his club for the first time during a 2–0 home defeat to Coventry City in the League Cup Fourth Round.

Throughout the 2008–09 season, O'Shea became a regular within the team, deputising at right-back because of injuries to Gary Neville and Wes Brown. On 20 January 2009, O'Shea scored his first goal of the season against Derby County in the second leg of the League Cup semi-final. O'Shea then started the 2009 Football League Cup final, before being replaced by Nemanja Vidić on 76 minutes, United won the game 4–1 on penalties. On 29 April 2009, O'Shea scored the only goal of the game in the first leg of the Champions League semi-final against Arsenal, this set United up to go on and win in the second leg by 4–1 on aggregate. O'Shea started and played the full 90 minutes in the 2009 Champions League final 2–0 loss to Barcelona, and by many accounts was one of United's better performers on the night. Sir Alex Ferguson had promised O'Shea, who was an unused substitute in the 2008 Champions League final, a starting place in the 2009 final for his contribution to the team that season.

O'Shea captained United for the second time against Birmingham City in their first game of the 2009–10 Premier League season. On his 350th appearance he scored his first league goal in over two years against Stoke City on 29 September 2009, a header in a 2–0 win. He captained the team for the third time in the second leg of United's 2010–11 UEFA Champions League semi-final victory over Schalke 04, but was not named in the squad for the final. O'Shea made 393 total appearances for Manchester United.

=== Sunderland ===
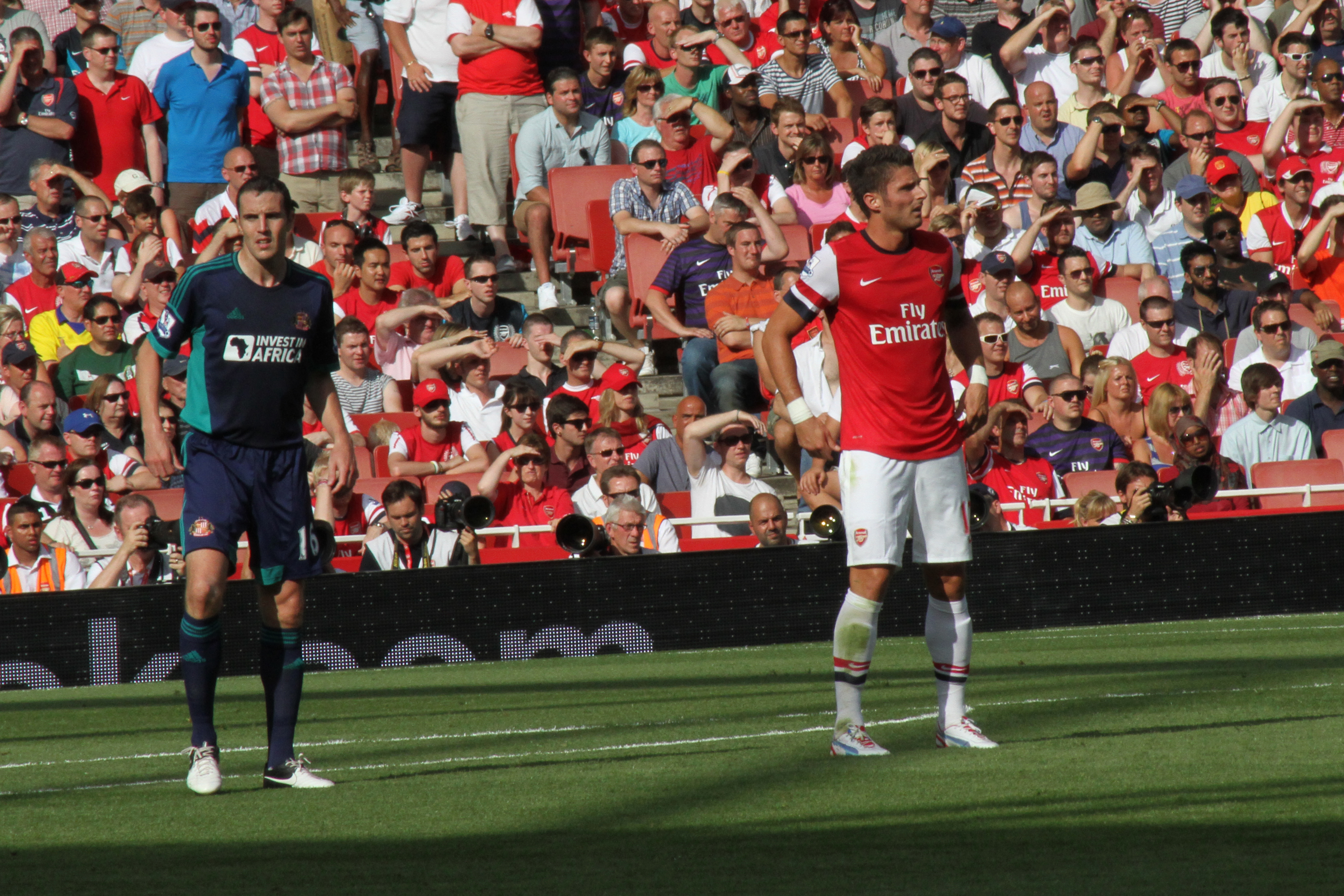
O'Shea (left) in action for Sunderland against Arsenal in 2012

On 7 July 2011, O'Shea signed a four-year contract with Sunderland, managed by former Manchester United captain Steve Bruce, who paid Manchester United an undisclosed fee for O'Shea. In his first appearance for Sunderland, a friendly against Arminia Bielefeld, O'Shea picked up a hamstring injury, ruling him out for the rest of pre-season and the start of the 2011–12 campaign. O'Shea made his first competitive appearance for Sunderland on 27 August 2011 in a goalless draw against Swansea.

O'Shea scored his first Sunderland goal at the Stadium of Light in the 2012–13 season in a 2–1 loss to Tottenham Hotspur.

At the end of the 2016–17 season, which ended in Sunderland's relegation, O'Shea's contract had initially expired. However, the Irishman agreed to sign a one-year contract lasting until July 2018.

O'Shea scored his first club goal for more than four years to help Sunderland clinch a 4–1 away win over Derby County to move off the bottom of the Championship table on 30 March 2018. At the end of the season, O'Shea suffered a second consecutive relegation with Sunderland as the team finished in last place.

=== Reading ===
On 6 June 2018, O'Shea agreed terms on a one-year deal with Championship club Reading. He would link up with his compatriot David Meyler who had signed for the Berkshire club a day earlier.

O'Shea made his Reading debut on 14 August 2018, coming on as an 82nd-minute substitute for Yakou Méïté in a 2–0 home win against Birmingham City in the EFL Cup. He made his league debut for the club on 22 September in a 3–0 home victory over Hull City in a match which he received a straight red card for a foul on Chris Martin.

O'Shea announced his retirement from football on 30 April 2019, his 38th birthday, and made his final career appearance five days later in a goalless draw at home to Birmingham City where he received a guard of honour from both sets of players.

== International career ==
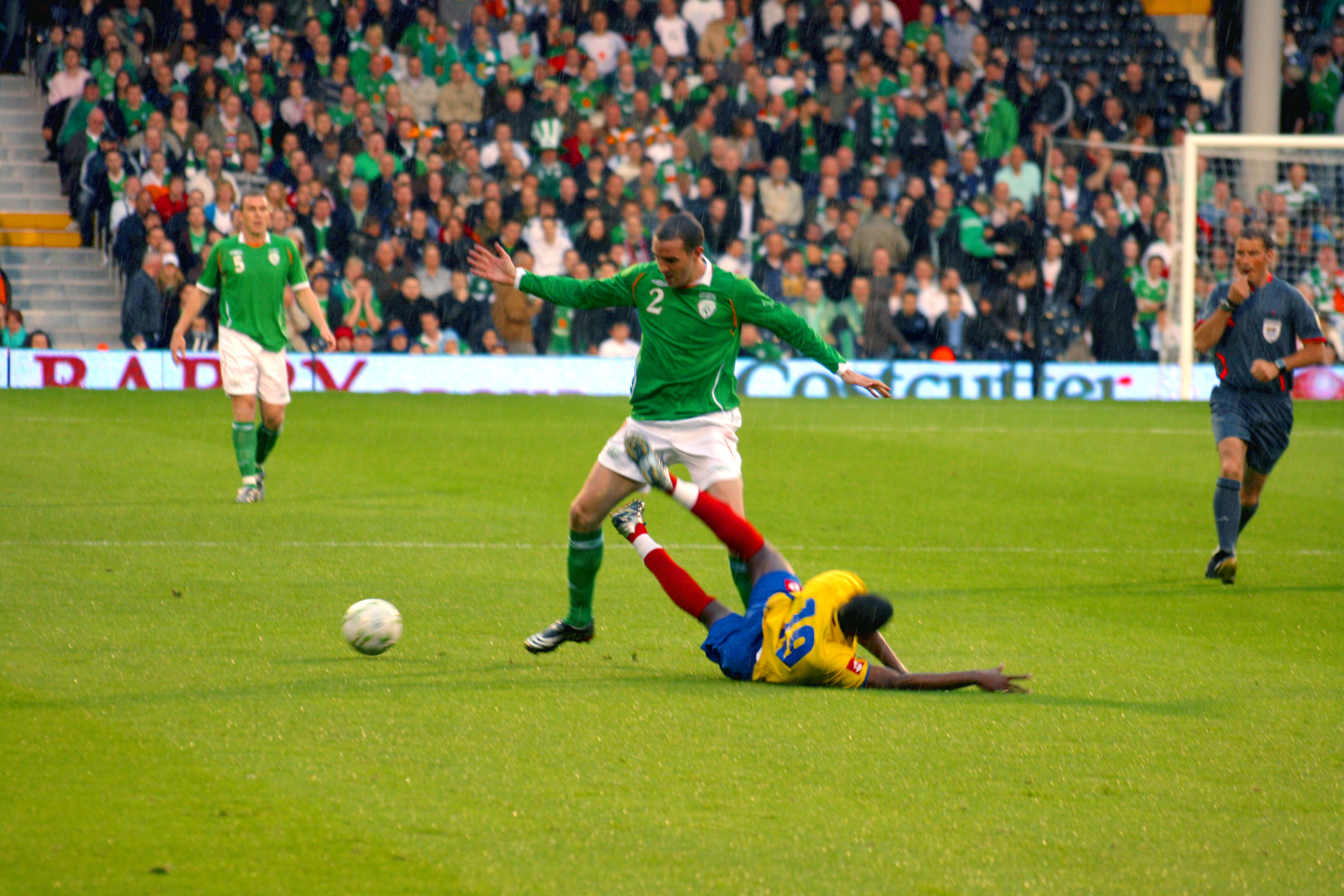
O'Shea playing for the Republic of Ireland against Colombia in 2008

O'Shea earned his first senior cap for the Republic of Ireland on 15 August 2001, when manager Mick McCarthy sent him on as an 84th-minute substitute for Gary Kelly in a friendly against Croatia at Lansdowne Road. He gave away a penalty for handball in injury time, which was scored by Davor Šuker for a 2–2 draw. He was not included in the Irish squad for the 2002 FIFA World Cup. On 19 August 2003, O'Shea scored his first international goal as he headed in Ireland's first in a 2–1 home friendly victory over Australia.

During the 2010 World Cup qualifying, O'Shea was ever present in the starting line-up for eight of the 10 games. On 1 April 2009, in the game against Italy, he was elbowed in the forehead by Giampaolo Pazzini, who earned the record for the fastest sending off in Italian football history. After receiving treatment for the bleeding, O'Shea continued playing all 90 minutes.

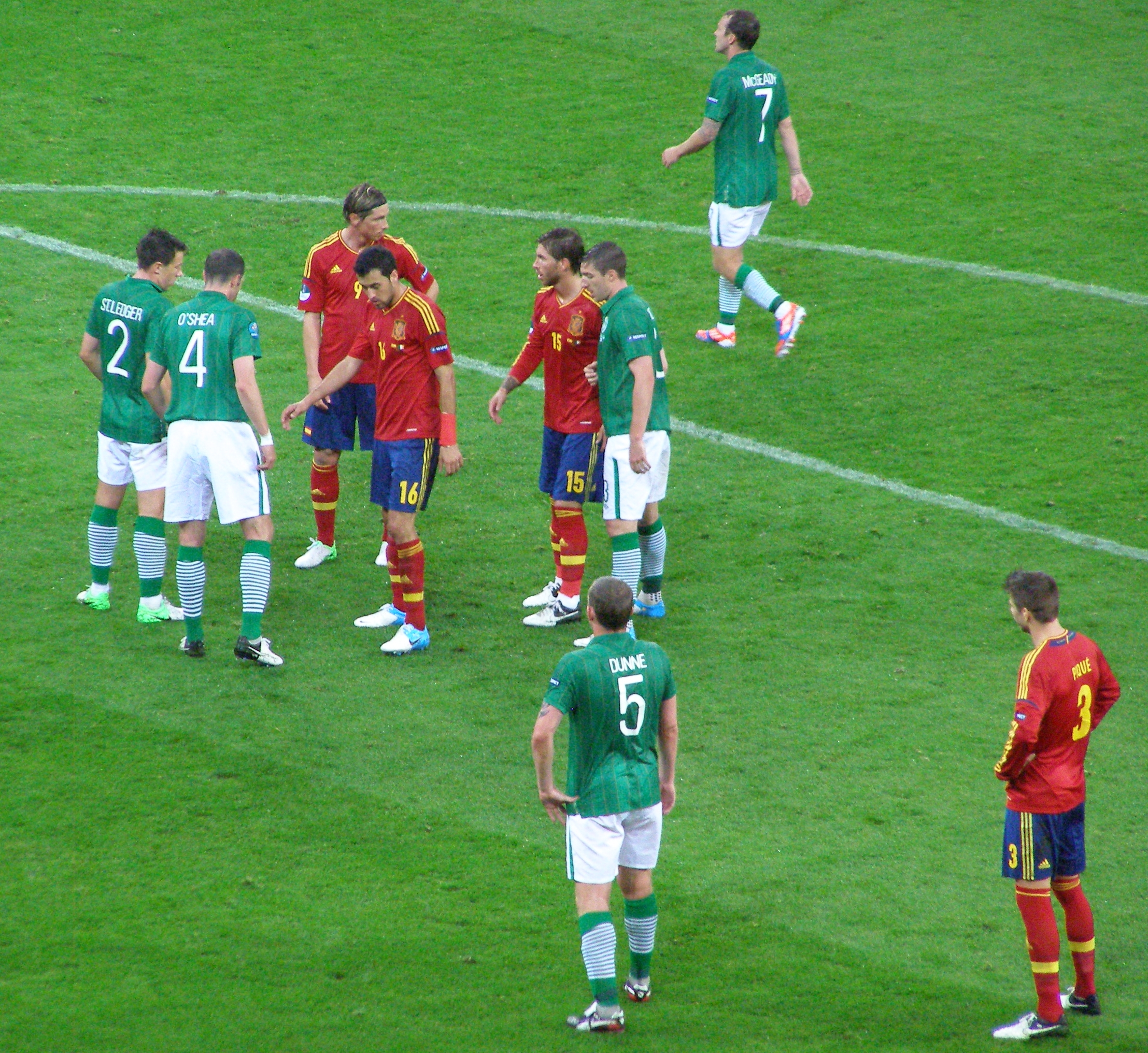
O'Shea (wearing No.4) playing for Ireland at UEFA Euro 2012 against Spain

Including the second leg of their play-off victory over Estonia, made nine appearances in UEFA Euro 2012 qualifying, as Ireland reached the continental tournament for the first time since 1988. He played every minute of their finals campaign, a group stage elimination after three defeats. On 15 August 2012, his 80th cap, O'Shea captained Ireland for the first time, in a goalless friendly draw against Serbia at the Red Star Stadium in Belgrade. On 15 October 2013, he opened a 3–1 World Cup qualifying victory over Kazakhstan at the Aviva Stadium, his second international goal and the first in over a decade.

O'Shea was scheduled to face Spain on 11 June 2013 at Yankee Stadium in New York, but was ruled out of the game over the sudden death of his uncle Jimmy O'Leary. On 14 October 2014, on his 100th cap, O'Shea scored the equalising goal with the last kick of the match, in a 1–1 draw against Germany at Gelsenkirchen, in a UEFA Euro 2016 qualifying match. In the final qualifier, a 2–1 defeat away to Poland on 11 October 2015, he was sent off for a foul on Robert Lewandowski and thus missed the first leg of the Republic's play-off.

O'Shea was selected in manager Martin O'Neill's 23-man squad for UEFA Euro 2016 in France. In the absence of Robbie Keane, he captained the Irish in their first two group matches, a 1–1 draw with Sweden and a 3–0 loss to Belgium. He was one of several players who lost their starting place for the decisive final game against Italy, as he and defensive partner Ciaran Clark made way for Shane Duffy and Richard Keogh; the game ended with a 1–0 victory. In the last 16, as Ireland lost 2–1 to the hosts at Parc Olympique Lyonnais, O'Shea entered as a 68th-minute substitute for James McClean.

Over a year after his penultimate game for Ireland, O'Shea played his final of 118 matches on 2 June 2018, a 2–1 friendly win over the United States at the Aviva Stadium. After 34 minutes, he was substituted to widespread applause as debutant Darragh Lenihan came onto the pitch. Before the game, he was congratulated by the President of Ireland, Michael D. Higgins, who called him "one of the most inspirational, committed and admired members of our national teams".

== Coaching career ==
In April 2020, O'Shea was named as assistant manager of the Republic of Ireland under-21 team under manager Jim Crawford.

On 22 July 2022, O'Shea joined Stoke City as first-team coach. He was one of 20 coaches who successfully completed their UEFA Pro Licence course with the Football Association of Ireland (FAI) in December 2022. O'Shea left his role at Stoke on 12 May 2023.

On 22 February 2023, O'Shea was named assistant manager of the Republic of Ireland senior team, under manager Stephen Kenny. He left in November after Kenny's contract ended.

When Wayne Rooney was appointed manager of EFL Championship club Birmingham City in October 2023, O'Shea joined his staff as a first-team coach. He left by mutual consent at his own request a few days after Rooney's sacking in January 2024.

On 28 February 2024, O'Shea was named as interim manager of the senior Republic of Ireland team for the March friendlies against Belgium and Switzerland, while the Football Association of Ireland continued their search for a permanent manager. He continued as interim manager for the friendlies against Hungary and Portugal in June. His debut on 23 March was a goalless draw at home to Belgium, with Evan Ferguson missing a penalty.

In August 2024, O'Shea returned to his role as assistant coach of the Republic of Ireland team under new manager Heimir Hallgrímsson.

== Personal life ==
O'Shea married his long-term partner, Yvonne Manning, in the Lady Chapel in Maynooth, County Kildare, Ireland on 8 June 2010. They have a son and a daughter.

== Career statistics ==
=== Club ===
Appearances and goals by club, season and competition
Club	Season	League			National cup		League cup		Europe		Other (Note: Includes other competitive competitions, including the FA Community Shield, UEFA Super Cup, Intercontinental Cup and FIFA Club World Cup)		Total	
Club	Season	Division	Apps	Goals	Apps	Goals	Apps	Goals	Apps	Goals	Apps	Goals	Apps	Goals
Manchester United	1999–2000	Premier League	0	0	—		1	0	0	0	0	0	1	0
Manchester United	2000–01	Premier League	0	0	0	0	2	0	0	0	0	0	2	0
Manchester United	2001–02	Premier League	9	0	0	0	1	0	3	0	0	0	13	0
Manchester United	2002–03	Premier League	32	0	1	0	3	0	16	0	0	0	52	0
Manchester United	2003–04	Premier League	33	2	6	0	2	0	7	0	1	0	49	2
Manchester United	2004–05	Premier League	23	2	4	1	4	0	5	0	1	0	37	3
Manchester United	2005–06	Premier League	34	1	2	0	4	1	7	0	0	0	47	2
Manchester United	2006–07	Premier League	32	4	5	0	1	0	11	1	0	0	49	5
Manchester United	2007–08	Premier League	28	0	2	0	1	0	6	0	1	0	38	0
Manchester United	2008–09	Premier League	30	0	4	0	6	1	12	1	2	0	54	2
Manchester United	2009–10	Premier League	15	1	0	0	0	0	3	0	1	0	19	1
Manchester United	2010–11	Premier League	20	0	4	0	1	0	6	0	1	0	32	0
Manchester United	Total		256	10	28	1	26	2	76	2	7	0	393	15
AFC Bournemouth (loan)	1999–2000	Second Division	10	1	0	0	—		—		—		10	1
Royal Antwerp (loan)	2000–01	Belgian First Division	14	0	0	0	—		—		—		14	0
Sunderland	2011–12	Premier League	29	0	5	0	0	0	—		—		34	0
Sunderland	2012–13	Premier League	34	2	0	0	2	0	—		—		36	2
Sunderland	2013–14	Premier League	33	1	2	0	7	0	—		—		42	1
Sunderland	2014–15	Premier League	37	0	4	0	2	0	—		—		43	0
Sunderland	2015–16	Premier League	28	0	1	0	2	0	—		—		31	0
Sunderland	2016–17	Premier League	28	0	1	0	1	0	—		—		30	0
Sunderland	2017–18	Championship	37	1	1	0	2	0	—		—		40	1
Sunderland	Total		226	4	14	0	16	0	—		—		256	4
Reading	2018–19	Championship	9	0	0	0	2	0	—		—		11	0
Career total			515	15	42	1	44	2	76	2	7	0	684	20

=== International ===
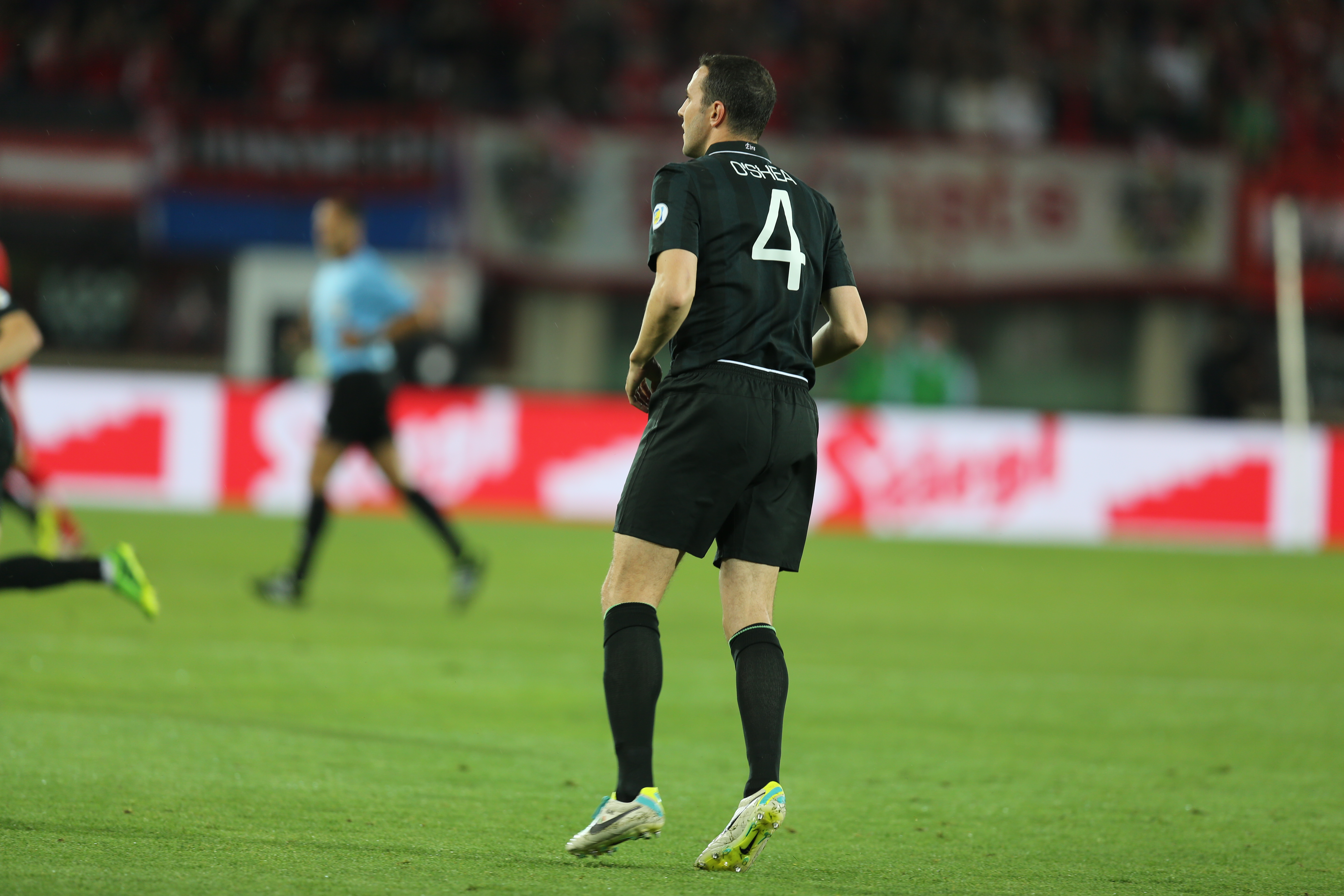
O'Shea in action for the Republic of Ireland against Austria, September 2013

Appearances and goals by national team and year
National team	Year	Apps	Goals
Republic of Ireland	2001	1	0
Republic of Ireland	2002	1	0
Republic of Ireland	2003	9	1
Republic of Ireland	2004	8	0
Republic of Ireland	2005	9	0
Republic of Ireland	2006	7	0
Republic of Ireland	2007	8	0
Republic of Ireland	2008	7	0
Republic of Ireland	2009	10	0
Republic of Ireland	2010	8	0
Republic of Ireland	2011	6	0
Republic of Ireland	2012	10	0
Republic of Ireland	2013	11	1
Republic of Ireland	2014	6	1
Republic of Ireland	2015	8	0
Republic of Ireland	2016	7	0
Republic of Ireland	2017	1	0
Republic of Ireland	2018	1	0
Total		118	3

Scores and results list Ireland's goal tally first, score column indicates score after each O'Shea goal.

List of international goals scored by John O'Shea
No.	Date	Venue	Cap	Opponent	Score	Result	Competition	Ref.
1	19 August 2003	Lansdowne Road, Dublin, Republic of Ireland	8	Australia	1–1	2–1	Friendly	
2	15 October 2013	Aviva Stadium, Dublin, Republic of Ireland	93	Kazakhstan	2–1	3–1	FIFA World Cup Qualification	
3	14 October 2014	Veltins-Arena, Gelsenkirchen, Germany	100	Germany	1–1	1–1	Euro 2016 qualifying	

== Managerial statistics ==
As of match played 11 June 2024

Managerial record by team and tenure
Team	From	To	Record								Ref
Team	From	To	G	W	D	L	GF	GA	GD	Win %	Ref
Republic of Ireland (Interim)	28 February 2024	11 June 2024	4	1	1	2	2	5	−3	25.00	

== Honours ==
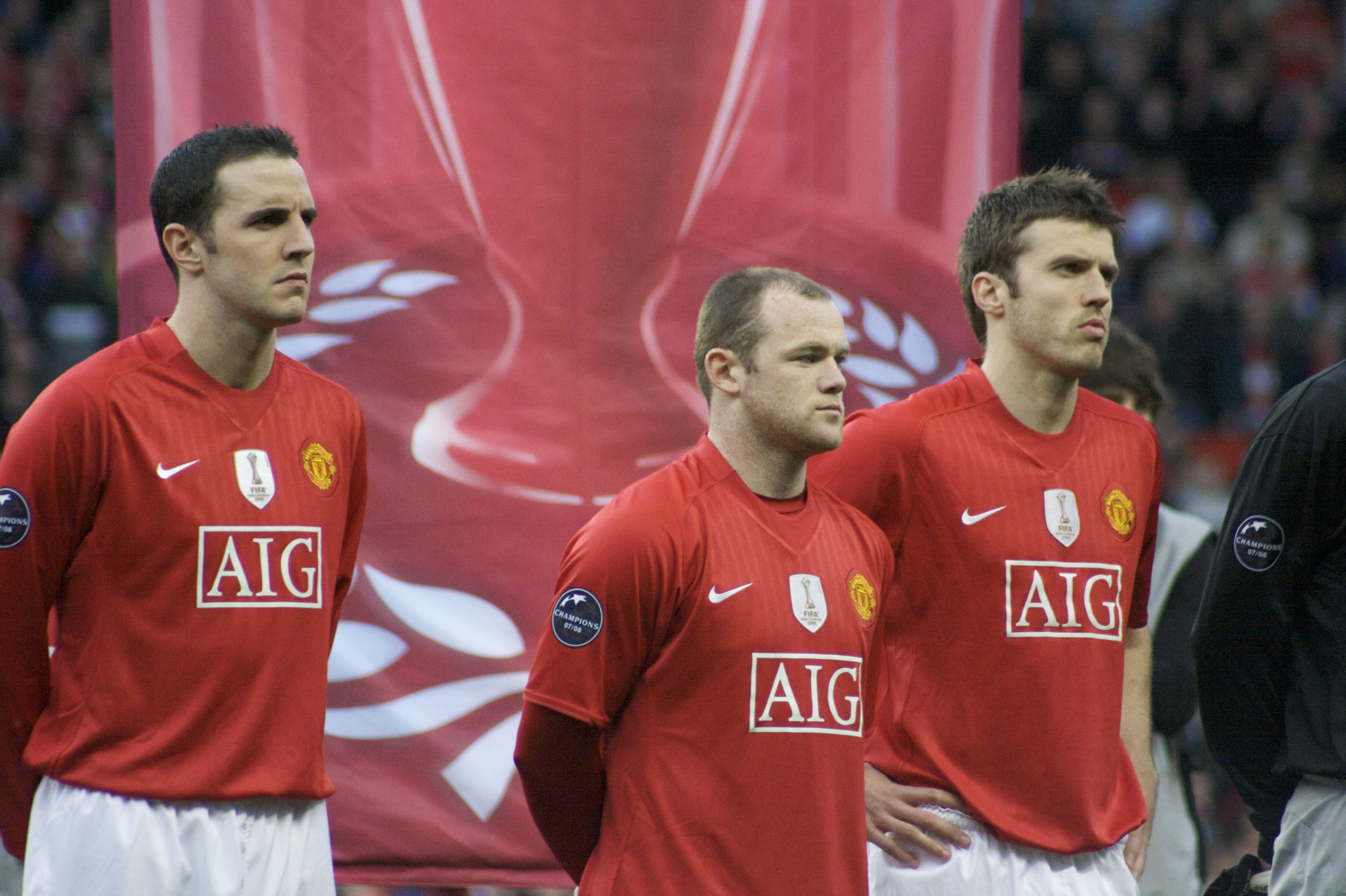
O'Shea, Wayne Rooney, and Michael Carrick lining up for Manchester United in 2009. The three are wearing UEFA Champions League and FIFA Club World Cup winners' badges.

Manchester United

- Premier League: 2002–03, 2006–07, 2007–08, 2008–09, 2010–11
- FA Cup: 2003–04; runner-up: 2004–05, 2006–07
- Football League Cup: 2005–06, 2008–09; runner-up: 2002–03
- FA Community Shield: 2003, 2007, 2008, 2010
- UEFA Champions League: 2007–08; runner-up: 2008–09
- FIFA Club World Cup: 2008

Sunderland

- Football League Cup runner-up: 2013–14

Republic of Ireland U16

- UEFA European Under-16 Championship: 1998

Individual

- Denzil Haroun Reserve Team Player of the Year: 2001–02
- FAI Senior International Player of the Year: 2014

== See also ==
- List of men's footballers with 100 or more international caps
