= Wes Brown =

English footballer (born 1979)

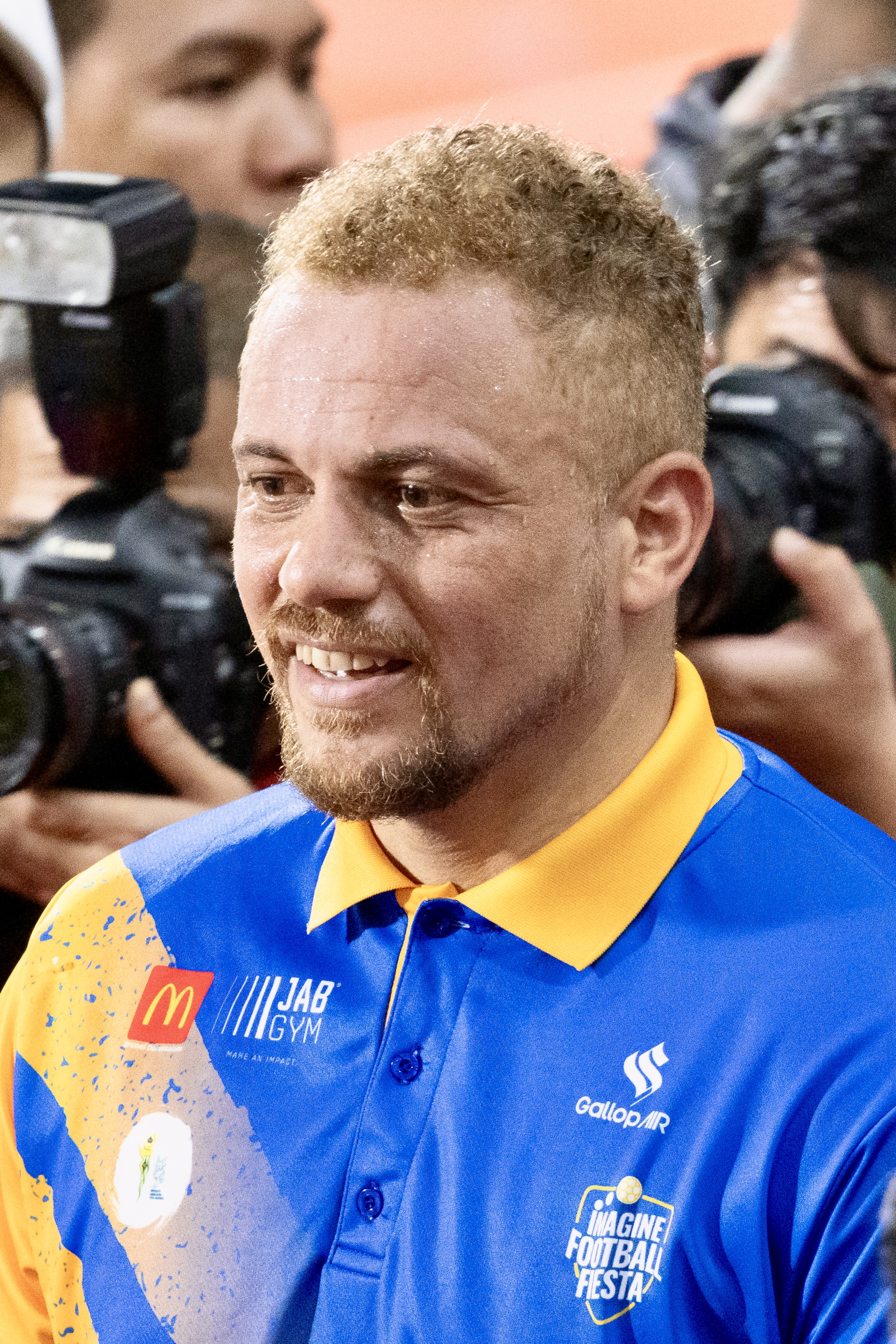
- Brown in 2024

Personal information
- Full name: Wesley Michael Brown
- Date of birth: 13 October 1979 (age 47)
- Place of birth: Longsight, Manchester, England
- Height: 6 ft 1 in (1.85 m)
- Positions: Centre back; right back

Youth career
- Fletcher Moss Rangers
- 1992–1996: Manchester United

Senior career*
Years	Team	Apps	(Gls)
1996–2011	Manchester United	232	(3)
2011–2016	Sunderland	76	(1)
2016–2017	Blackburn Rovers	5	(1)
2017–2018	Kerala Blasters	14	(1)
Total		327	(6)

International career
1998–2000	England U21	8	(0)
1999–2010	England	23	(1)
- * Club domestic league appearances and goals

Wesley Michael Brown (born 13 October 1979) is an English former professional footballer who played as a centre back or right back. He spent the majority of his career at Manchester United, where he won 13 trophies including seven Premier League titles and two UEFA Champions Leagues.

Brown began his career with Manchester United by joining the club's academy at the age of 12 in 1992. After turning professional in 1996, he made his senior debut in 1998 and became a semi regular first team player during the 1998–99 season, when the club won the Treble. After a year-long hiatus due to injury, Brown became a regular fixture in the first team from 2000 onwards. Over the next eight years, he won numerous honours, including six more Premier League titles and another Champions League. Former Manchester United manager Sir Alex Ferguson has stated that Brown is "without question the best natural defender this club has had for years". After 15 years with Manchester United, Brown was allowed to leave for Sunderland, where he spent five years and helped them reach the 2014 League Cup final.

Brown earned his first England cap in 1999 and was selected to play at the 2002 World Cup. He played in the UEFA Euro 2008 qualifiers but England failed to progress to the final tournament. He scored his first international goal in 2008 against the Czech Republic. Brown announced his retirement from international football on 8 August 2010, just a day after being recalled to the England squad by Fabio Capello.

== Club career ==
=== Manchester United ===
Born in Longsight, Manchester, Brown began his football career as a schoolboy playing for the Burnage High School and Fletcher Moss Rangers, a Greater Manchester youth side, and was a former student of the Lilleshall Hall FA School of Excellence, as well as spending time at United's football Academy, which he joined at the age of 12. Brown showed talent and maturity at an early age, signing full professional terms with boyhood club Manchester United on 4 November 1996 at the age of 17.

Brown went on to success with the reserve and youth sides, winning the FA Youth Cup and a Lancashire Division One medal with the reserves. He also added two Jimmy Murphy (Young Player of the Year) awards to his collection, becoming only the second player to receive the award for a second time (the other being Ryan Giggs).

On 4 May 1998, Brown made his first team FA Premier League debut against Leeds United, coming on as a substitute. His breakthrough would occur the next year, the 1998–99 season, where he made several first-team appearances at right-back as well as his more natural position of centre-back. United completed the treble that season, winning the Premier League, FA Cup and UEFA Champions League.

Brown suffered the first of what would be a string of injuries while training for the 1999–2000 campaign. As a result, he did not play a single competitive game all season, while United went on to seal their sixth Premier League title in eight seasons.

His strong comeback the following year prompted praise from all corners, with club manager Sir Alex Ferguson making waves by proclaiming Brown to be Manchester United's most talented defender.

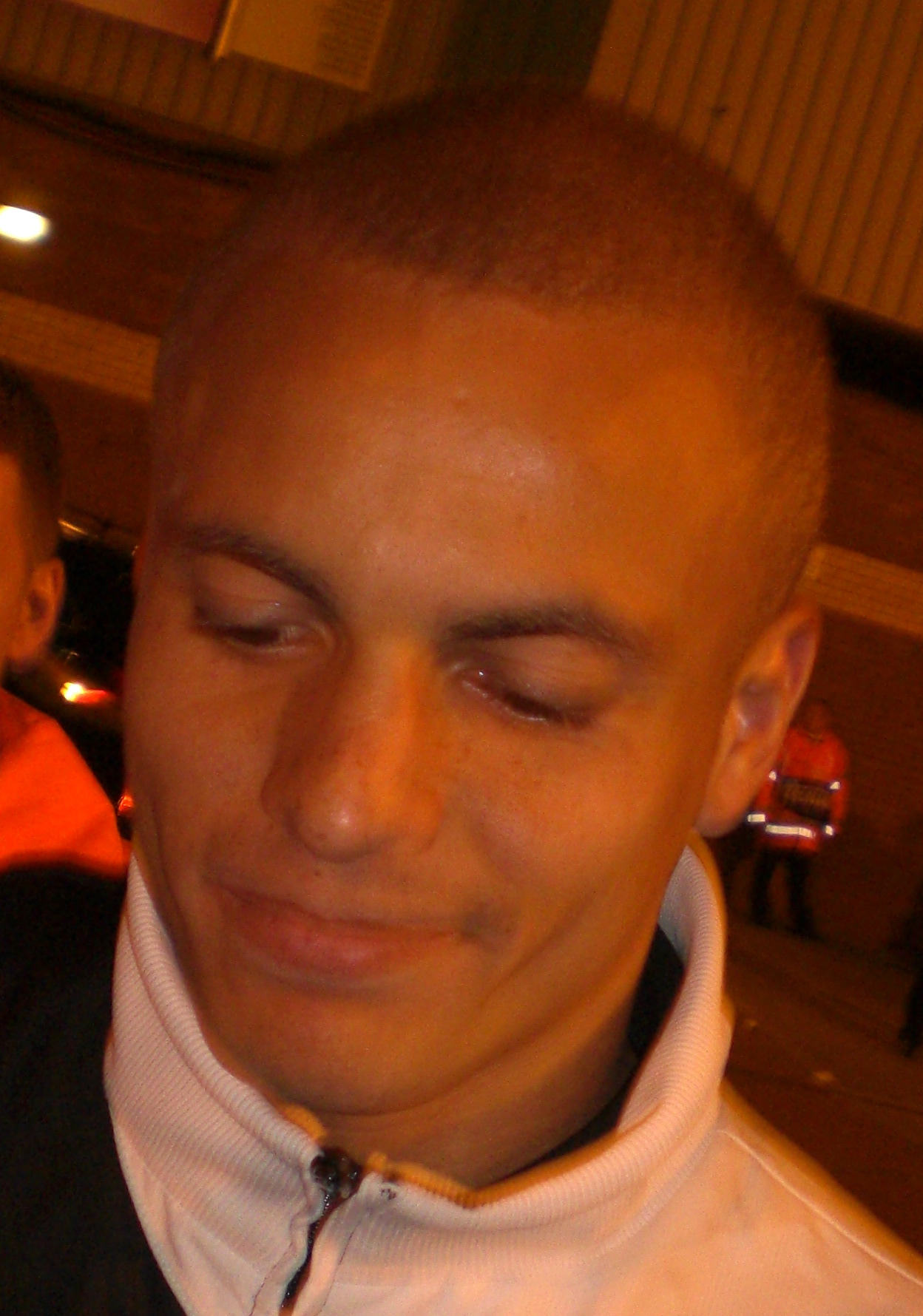
Brown after a match against Barcelona in April 2008

A fine 2000–01 campaign was followed by another solid year in 2001–02. His reputation grew even greater during the 2002–03 season, but again, his performances were marred by injury. Brown tore a knee ligament on the final day of the season, and did not return until midway through the 2003–04 season. Brown finished the season in good form, notably giving an imperious, man of the match-winning performance in the FA Cup semi-final win over Arsenal. It was after this fine display that Ferguson re-iterated his confidence in Brown's abilities.

Brown was a member of the side that won the FA Cup that year, against Millwall in Cardiff, and later went on to collect runners-up medals in the 2005 and 2007 finals.

The signing of Nemanja Vidić in January 2006, who would go on to forge a highly successful partnership with Rio Ferdinand, along with Brown's continuing injury problems, meant the defender continued to struggle to hold down a place in United's starting line-up. In the 2007–08 season, however, Brown established himself as the club's first-choice right-back. He ended the season by assisting Cristiano Ronaldo's goal in the 2008 Champions League final, which United eventually won on penalty kicks to complete a league and European double.

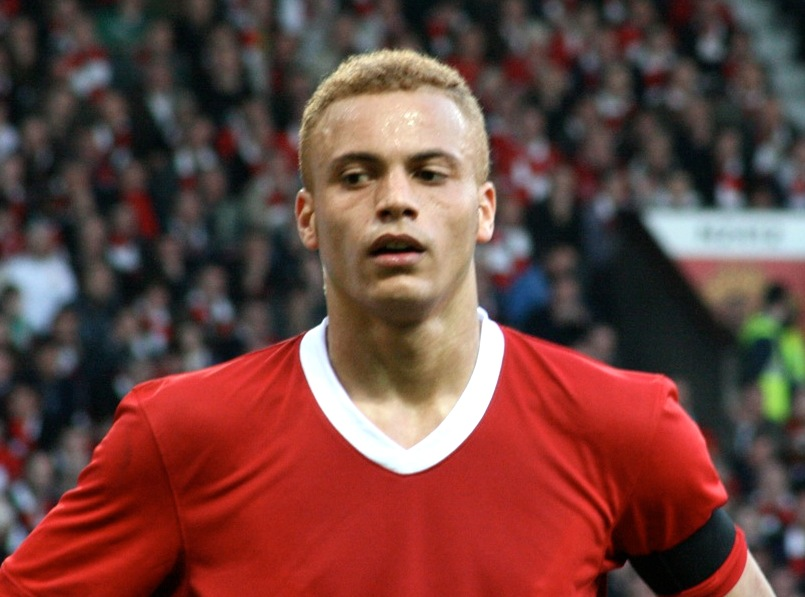
Brown playing in the Manchester derby. Manchester United wore a plain kit for this game to signify the 50th anniversary of the Munich air disaster.

After nearly three years without scoring a Premier League goal for United, Brown scored on 23 March 2008 against Liverpool, the first in a 3–0 win.

After initially rejecting a new contract offer in December 2007, Brown signed a new five-year contract along with fellow defender Rio Ferdinand and midfielder Michael Carrick in April 2008, which was to keep him at Old Trafford until 2013.

On 4 October 2008, Brown scored only the fourth goal of his Manchester United career when he headed in Wayne Rooney's cross in United's 2–0 win away to Blackburn Rovers. The goal was controversial, however, as Blackburn's players believed that Nemanja Vidić had impeded their goalkeeper, Jason Brown, allowing Brown to head in at the far post.

Brown was ruled out of first team action for around five weeks in November 2008, following an exploratory ankle operation. Brown made his first start in eight months away against Hull City on 24 May 2009.

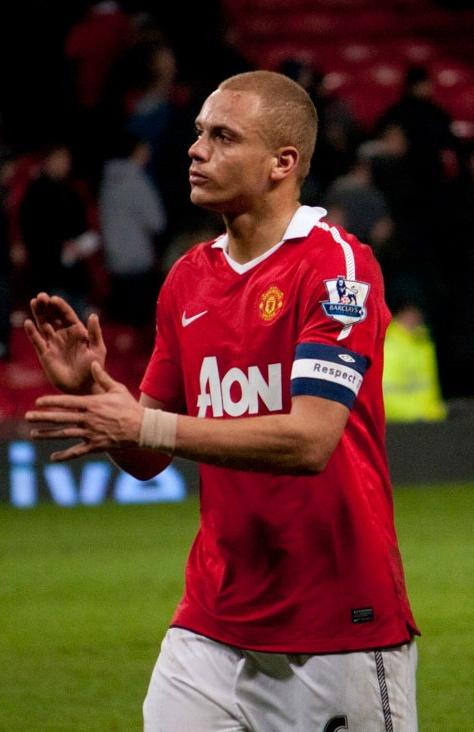
Brown playing for Manchester United in 2011

Brown started the following season, featuring throughout August in the league, but between September and October only appeared in United's League Cup campaign, before injury to both Rio Ferdinand and Nemanja Vidić saw Brown return to Premier League action as he partnered Jonny Evans in central defence against Blackburn, and both men produced an assured and professional display. This was Brown's first Premier League start since the 2–1 victory against Arsenal, at the end of August.

Brown captained the League Cup game against Wolverhampton Wanderers in which they won 3–2. On 19 February, he scored his first FA Cup goal in Manchester United's 1–0 win over Crawley Town. He also captained United again in the Crawley match.

=== Sunderland ===
Brown joined Sunderland on 7 July 2011 on a four-year contract for an undisclosed fee. Brown made his debut on the opening day of the season at Liverpool, where he was awarded man of the match as Sunderland drew 1–1. On 5 November 2011, Brown scored an own goal in a match against his former club, Manchester United. Brown's first goal for Sunderland came on 21 December 2011, when he scored the winning goal with two minutes remaining in a 3–2 victory away to Queens Park Rangers. Brown's season ended through injury in the FA Cup fourth-round tie with Middlesbrough in January 2012.

He made his Premier League comeback on 2 November 2013 in a 1–0 defeat against Hull. On 23 November 2013, Brown was sent off during a 2–0 defeat against Stoke City, a decision that was overturned on appeal on 26 November 2013. Brown was sent off again on 21 December 2013, in a 0–0 draw against Norwich City. Brown was given his third red card of the season in the fourth minute of Sunderland's 2–0 defeat to Hull City.

On 28 February 2015, Brown was sent off during a match against Manchester United, which Sunderland lost 2–0, though it was John O'Shea who actually committed the foul. Referee Roger East insisted he got the decision right. The red card was later rescinded after Sunderland won an appeal.

At the end of the 2014–15 season, Brown was named as one of several Sunderland players available on a free transfer at the end of his contract in June 2015. On 12 June 2015, however, manager Dick Advocaat signed Brown to a one-year contract extension.

=== Blackburn Rovers ===
On 21 September 2016, following a number of injury set-backs and three-and-a-half months training with the club to regain fitness, Brown signed a short-term contract with Blackburn Rovers, lasting until the end of the season. As part of the deal, Brown would also take up a coaching role with the club's development squad, a team for which he had played a number of games while regaining fitness. He worked alongside existing coaches Damien Johnson and David Dunn and offered guidance and advice to the club's younger players. He made his debut and scored his first goal for Blackburn against Reading on 17 December 2016.

=== Kerala Blasters ===
Brown reunited with former Manchester United coach René Meulensteen in August 2017, joining Meulensteen at Indian Super League club Kerala Blasters.

== Coaching career ==
Brown was part of the Blackburn Rovers Under-23s and Academy coaching setup during his time with the club. He holds the UEFA 'A' Licence, which he achieved with the Irish Football Association.

== International career ==
Brown has represented England at international level, making 23 appearances since debuting in 1999. He was notably part of the England squad at the 2002 FIFA World Cup in Japan and South Korea.

Brown made his debut in 1999 against Hungary and booked a place in Sven-Göran Eriksson's squad for the 2002 World Cup, although he spent his time on the bench.

Brown performed consistently well in the 2005–06 season which led to his recall to the England squad for the friendly game against Uruguay. Although he played no part in this fixture, he hoped to make it into the final England squad for the 2006 World Cup, though he was ultimately not selected.

He was once again recalled to the England squad by coach Steve McClaren, and played in a defeat of Andorra in UEFA Euro 2008 qualifying on 2 September, partnering John Terry at the heart of the England defence in place of injured Manchester United teammate Rio Ferdinand. He replaced Terry in a friendly against Brazil on 1 June 2007, but he slipped up with his first touch of the ball and nearly scored an own goal.

=== Fabio Capello era ===
Fabio Capello named Brown as a starter in both of his first two games in charge of the national team, against Switzerland and France. He also played 56 minutes in England's 2–0 win over the United States on 28 May 2008.

Brown scored his sole senior international goal in a friendly against the Czech Republic on 20 August 2008 at Wembley Stadium, heading in a David Beckham corner in the 45th minute.

Brown made three appearances for England in their qualification for the 2010 World Cup in wins over Croatia (4–1), Kazakhstan (5–1) and Belarus (3–1).

Brown was called up for the England squad to face Slovenia in a friendly match on 5 September 2009, but was an unused substitute. He was then called up for a friendly against Brazil to be played Khalifa International Stadium in Qatar, where he played the full 90 minutes.

Brown also played in England's 3–1 win over Egypt on 3 March 2010. He did not, however, make the England squad for the 2010 World Cup in South Africa after an injury-hit season.

Brown retired from international football on 8 August 2010, one day after being selected for a friendly against Hungary.

== Personal life ==
Brown was married to Leanne Wassell, with whom he has three daughters. They broke up in 2022 His father, Bancroft Brown, died in February 2008. His half-sister, Claire Fallows, died on 19 July 2008 during pregnancy. Brown's younger brother, Reece, played for Bury having joined the Manchester United Academy at the age of nine, also plays at centre-back and was an England under-20 international. Another brother, Clive, was on the books of Manchester City as a youth player in the late 1990s, before going on to play for Hyde United, Bangor City, Mossley, Woodley Sports and played for New Mills.

He was declared bankrupt on 12 April 2023.

== Career statistics ==
=== Club ===
Appearances and goals by club, season and competition
Club	Season	League			FA Cup		League Cup		Continental		Other (Note: Appearances in FA Community Shield, UEFA Super Cup, Intercontinental Cup, FIFA Club World Cup)		Total	
Club	Season	Division	Apps	Goals	Apps	Goals	Apps	Goals	Apps	Goals	Apps	Goals	Apps	Goals
Manchester United	1997–98	Premier League	2	0	0	0	0	0	0	0	0	0	2	0
Manchester United	1998–99	Premier League	14	0	2	0	1	0	4	0	0	0	21	0
Manchester United	1999–2000	Premier League	0	0	–		0	0	0	0	0	0	0	0
Manchester United	2000–01	Premier League	28	0	1	0	1	0	11	0	0	0	41	0
Manchester United	2001–02	Premier League	17	0	0	0	0	0	7	0	0	0	24	0
Manchester United	2002–03	Premier League	22	0	2	0	5	0	6	1	0	0	35	1
Manchester United	2003–04	Premier League	17	0	6	0	0	0	2	0	0	0	25	0
Manchester United	2004–05	Premier League	21	1	6	0	3	0	7	0	0	0	37	1
Manchester United	2005–06	Premier League	19	0	4	0	5	0	3	0	0	0	31	0
Manchester United	2006–07	Premier League	22	0	6	0	2	0	7	0	0	0	37	0
Manchester United	2007–08	Premier League	36	1	4	0	1	0	10	0	1	0	52	1
Manchester United	2008–09	Premier League	8	1	0	0	1	0	2	0	2	0	13	1
Manchester United	2009–10	Premier League	19	0	1	0	5	0	4	0	0	0	29	0
Manchester United	2010–11	Premier League	7	0	3	1	3	0	2	0	0	0	15	1
Manchester United	Total		232	3	35	1	27	0	65	1	3	0	362	5
Sunderland	2011–12	Premier League	20	1	1	0	1	0	–		–		22	1
Sunderland	2012–13	Premier League	0	0	0	0	0	0	–		–		0	0
Sunderland	2013–14	Premier League	25	0	1	0	5	0	–		–		31	0
Sunderland	2014–15	Premier League	25	0	2	0	1	0	–		–		28	0
Sunderland	2015–16	Premier League	6	0	0	0	0	0	–		–		6	0
Sunderland	Total		76	1	4	0	7	0	0	0	0	0	87	1
Blackburn Rovers	2016–17	Championship	5	1	1	0	0	0	–		–		6	1
Kerala Blasters	2017–18	Indian Super League	14	1	—		—		—		1	0	15	1
Career total			327	6	40	1	34	0	65	1	4	0	470	8

=== International ===
Appearances and goals by national team and year
National team	Year	Apps	Goals
England	1999	1	0
England	2000	1	0
England	2001	2	0
England	2002	2	0
England	2003	1	0
England	2004	0	0
England	2005	2	0
England	2006	1	0
England	2007	4	0
England	2008	7	1
England	2009	1	0
England	2010	1	0
Total		23	1

== Honours ==
Manchester United

- Premier League: 1998–99, 2000–01, 2002–03, 2006–07, 2007–08, 2008–09, 2010–11
- FA Cup: 1998–99, 2003–04
- Football League Cup: 2005–06, 2009–10; runner-up: 2002–03
- FA Community Shield: 2007, 2008
- UEFA Champions League: 1998–99, 2007–08

Sunderland

- Football League Cup runner-up: 2013–14

Individual

- Jimmy Murphy Academy Player of the Year: 1997–98, 1998–99
- PFA Team of the Year: 2000–01 Premier League
