= 2007 FA Community Shield =

- Match programme cover
Chelsea	Manchester United
1	1
- Manchester United won 3–0 on penalties
- Date: 5 August 2007
- Venue: Wembley Stadium, London
- Man of the Match: Ashley Cole (Chelsea)
- Referee: Mark Halsey (Lancashire)
- Attendance: 80,731
- Weather: Clear; 27 °C (81 °F)

The 2007 FA Community Shield (also known as The FA Community Shield sponsored by McDonald's for sponsorship reasons) was the 85th staging of the FA Community Shield, an annual football match played between the reigning Premier League champions and FA Cup winners. The match was played on 5 August 2007 between 2006–07 FA Premier League champions Manchester United and 2006–07 FA Cup winners Chelsea, who beat United in the final. Manchester United won the game 3–0 on penalties, after the match finished 1–1. Ryan Giggs opened the scoring in the 35th minute, before Florent Malouda equalised just before half-time.

The match then went to penalties, where Edwin van der Sar saved all three of Chelsea's penalties, leaving Wayne Rooney to score his penalty and win the match for United.

It was the first Community Shield match to be played at the new Wembley Stadium. Manchester United and Chelsea also contested the last Community Shield (then the Charity Shield) to be played at the old Wembley in 2000, with Chelsea winning the match 2–0.

== Match details ==
5 August 2007
15:00 BST

Chelsea	1–1	Manchester United
Malouda 45'	Report	Giggs 35'
Penalties
Pizarro (penalty missed); Lampard (penalty missed); Wright-Phillips (penalty missed)	0–3	(penalty scored) Ferdinand; (penalty scored) Carrick; (penalty scored) Rooney

Wembley Stadium, London
Attendance: 80,731
Referee: Mark Halsey (Lancashire)

Chelsea	Manchester United

GK	1	(Czech Republic) Petr Čech
RB	2	(England) Glen Johnson		(substituted off) 78'
CB	6	(Portugal) Ricardo Carvalho	(yellow card) 63'
CB	22	(Israel) Tal Ben Haim	(yellow card) 33'
LB	3	(England) Ashley Cole		(substituted off) 68'
DM	5	(Ghana) Michael Essien
DM	12	(Nigeria) Mikel John Obi	(yellow card) 90+1'
CM	8	(England) Frank Lampard (c)
RW	24	(England) Shaun Wright-Phillips
LW	15	(France) Florent Malouda		(substituted off) 52'
CF	10	(England) Joe Cole		(substituted off) 82'
Substitutes:
GK	23	(Italy) Carlo Cudicini
GK	40	(Portugal) Hilário
DF	39	(England) Harry Worley
MF	9	(England) Steve Sidwell		(substituted on) 78'
MF	19	(France) Lassana Diarra		(substituted on) 68'
FW	14	(Peru) Claudio Pizarro		(substituted on) 52'
FW	17	(England) Scott Sinclair		(substituted on) 82'
Manager:
(Portugal) José Mourinho

GK	1	(Netherlands) Edwin van der Sar
RB	6	(England) Wes Brown
CB	5	(England) Rio Ferdinand
CB	15	(Serbia) Nemanja Vidić
LB	27	(France) Mikaël Silvestre		(substituted off) 68'
RM	7	(Portugal) Cristiano Ronaldo
CM	22	(Republic of Ireland) John O'Shea
CM	16	(England) Michael Carrick
LM	3	(France) Patrice Evra
SS	11	(Wales) Ryan Giggs (c)		(substituted off) 81'
CF	10	(England) Wayne Rooney	(yellow card) 45+3'
Substitutes:
GK	29	(Poland) Tomasz Kuszczak
DF	19	(Spain) Gerard Piqué
DF	26	(England) Phil Bardsley
MF	24	(Scotland) Darren Fletcher		(substituted on) 81'
MF	30	(England) Lee Martin
FW	17	(Portugal) Nani		(substituted on) 68'
FW	33	(England) Chris Eagles
Manager:
(Scotland) Sir Alex Ferguson

Man of the match

- Ashley Cole (Chelsea)

Match officials

- Assistant referees:
  - Darren Cann (Norfolk)
  - Martin Yerby (Kent)
- Fourth official: Chris Foy (Merseyside)

Match rules

- 90 minutes.
- Penalty shoot-out if scores level.
- Seven named substitutes.
- Maximum of six substitutions.

== Match statistics ==
=== First half ===
Statistic	Chelsea	Manchester United
Total shots	3	6
Shots on target	2	2
Ball possession	52%	48%
Corner kicks	1	3
Fouls committed	8	9
Offsides	1	0
Yellow cards	1	1
Red cards	0	0

=== Second half ===
Statistic	Chelsea	Manchester United
Total shots	2	4
Shots on target	0	2
Ball possession	50%	50%
Corner kicks	4	5
Fouls committed	6	6
Offsides	2	1
Yellow cards	2	0
Red cards	0	0

=== Overall ===
Statistic	Chelsea	Manchester United
Total shots	5	10
Shots on target	2	4
Ball possession	52%	48%
Corner kicks	5	8
Fouls committed	14	15
Offsides	3	1
Yellow cards	3	1
Red cards	0	0
