= 2006–07 Manchester United F.C. season =

English football club season

Manchester United
2006–07 season
- Chairman: Joel and Avram Glazer
- Manager: Sir Alex Ferguson
- Stadium: Old Trafford
- FA Premier League: 1st
- FA Cup: Runners-up
- League Cup: Fourth round
- UEFA Champions League: Semi-finals
- Top goalscorer: League: Cristiano Ronaldo (17 goals); All: Cristiano Ronaldo; Wayne Rooney (23 each)
- Highest home attendance: 76,098 (vs. Blackburn Rovers, 31 March)
- Lowest home attendance: 61,325 (vs. Middlesbrough, 19 March)
- Average home league attendance: 75,826
Home colours	Away colours	Third colours

The 2006–07 season was Manchester United's 15th season in the Premier League, and their 32nd consecutive season in the top division of English football. United enjoyed a much more successful season than the previous three seasons, winning the Premier League by a six-point margin over Chelsea. They also reached the final of the FA Cup and the semi-finals of the UEFA Champions League, losing to Chelsea and Milan respectively. However, for all their success in the major competitions, the club was unable to defend the League Cup title they had won in 2005–06, losing to Southend United in the Fourth Round.

Manchester United were not only dominant on a team level in 2006–07, but also on an individual level, with eight United players earning spots in the PFA Team of the Year, as well as Cristiano Ronaldo picking up no less than eight individual awards for his performances over the season and Sir Alex Ferguson winning the Premier League's Manager of the Season award.

The 2006–07 season also marked the 50th anniversary of the Busby Babes' first foray into European competition. The event was marked by a charity football match, organised in collaboration with UEFA, who were commemorating 50 years since the signing of the Treaty of Rome, against a team of the best players from Europe's top clubs.

== Pre-season and friendlies ==
United began their pre-season in July 2006 with the Vodacom Challenge in South Africa, their first time in the country for 13 years. The tournament involved matches against South Africa's top two teams, Orlando Pirates and Kaizer Chiefs, followed by a further match against the winner of a play-off between the two host sides. The Red Devils started well, beating Orlando Pirates 4–0 in their first game, but almost came unstuck against Kaizer Chiefs, requiring an 83rd-minute goal from Dong Fangzhuo to secure the 1–0 win. Kaizer Chiefs then beat Orlando Pirates in the play-off, and managed to hold a relatively sub-par United side to a 0–0 draw before beating them 4–3 on penalties.

The team then took their pre-season back to Britain, beating Celtic 3–0 at Parkhead. This was followed by a 2–1 defeat to Preston North End, but the team bounced back to defeat Macclesfield Town 2–1 two days later.

The start of August saw United take part in the Amsterdam Tournament, involving Ajax, Inter Milan and Porto. The Reds played two games in Amsterdam, beating both Porto and Ajax, but the tournament will be remembered mostly for the sendings-off of both Paul Scholes – for a clumsy, mistimed challenge in the match against Porto – and Wayne Rooney – who inadvertently caught Porto defender Pepe in the face with his hand as he jumped uncontested for a high ball. In accordance with FIFA disciplinary procedure, the red cards resulted in the pair missing the first three games of the season.

Back to Britain again, and a fixture against Oxford United was next up, which United won comfortably 4–1. Finally, United returned home to Old Trafford on 12 August for their only home friendly of the 2006–07 pre-season. The visitors were Sevilla, who helped mark the official opening of Old Trafford's new North-West and North-East quadrants with a 3–0 win to United in front of a half-capacity crowd.

United played one more friendly during the 2006–07 season, the UEFA Celebration Match on 13 March. The match marked the 50th anniversary of the Busby Babes' first foray into European competition and 50 years since the signing of the Treaty of Rome, the treaty that laid the foundations for what became known as the European Union. The Red Devils took on a European XI, coached by the 2006 World Cup-winning manager Marcelo Lippi. The original squad selected by Lippi was hit by last minute injuries and withdrawals by some big names like Ronaldinho and David Beckham, forcing replacements to be drawn from Premier League teams like Bolton Wanderers and Portsmouth at short notice. Henrik Larsson was named captain for the Europe XI, the day after his loan spell at Old Trafford came to an end. United started the game very brightly, finding themselves 4–1 up at half-time, thanks to goals from Wayne Rooney, Cristiano Ronaldo and Wes Brown. However, no further goals came for the home side as the visitors scored two consolation goals, leaving United as 4–3 winners.

Date	Opponents	H / A	Result F–A	Scorers	Attendance
15 July 2006	Orlando Pirates	N	4–0	Solskjær (2) 4', 43', Richardson 57', Seema 60' (o.g.)	
18 July 2006	Kaizer Chiefs	N	1–0	Dong 83'	
22 July 2006	Kaizer Chiefs	A	0–0 (3–4p)		
26 July 2006	Celtic	A	3–0	Evans 8', Scholes (2) 61', 85'	
29 July 2006	Preston North End	A	1–2	Solskjær 85' (pen.)	12,541
31 July 2006	Macclesfield Town	A	2–1	Rooney 46', Campbell 71'	
4 August 2006	Porto	N	3–1	Scholes 11', Rooney 19', Solskjær 73'	25,000
5 August 2006	Ajax	A	1–0	Giggs 76'	
8 August 2006	Oxford United	A	4–1	Solskjær 6', Ronaldo (2) 13', 58', Fletcher 15'	
12 August 2006	Sevilla	H	3–0	Saha 63', Ronaldo 88', D. Jones 90'	40,134
13 March 2007	Europe XI	H	4–3	Rooney (2) 6', 43', Brown 9', Ronaldo 35'	74,343

== Premier League ==
After an impressive pre-season, losing only two out of the ten games played, United began the Premier League season in earnest. Coming up against a Fulham side that had caused them so many problems in the past, United ran riot, scoring four goals inside the first twenty minutes at Old Trafford and eventually triumphing 5–1. Wayne Rooney and Cristiano Ronaldo scored three goals between them against Fulham, but the partnership was broken up for the next game against Charlton by Rooney's suspension, picked up in the friendly against Porto.

Nevertheless, United ran out 3–0 winners over the team that would end the season in 19th place, with goals coming from Darren Fletcher, Louis Saha and Ole Gunnar Solskjær, who scored his first Premiership goal since April 2003. August was rounded off with a 2–1 win away to Watford, the winner scored by Ryan Giggs, who was celebrating his 600th start for United.

The team carried this rich vein of form into September, narrowly beating Tottenham 1–0 to make it four wins out of four. United's best start to a Premiership campaign came to an end, however, with the visit of Arsenal to Old Trafford. The Red Devils survived an early scare when new goalkeeper Tomasz Kuszczak saved a penalty he had given away when he brought down Emmanuel Adebayor, but Adebayor made amends for Gilberto's missed spot-kick by scoring the winning goal four minutes from time, and knocking United from the Premiership top spot for the first time in the season.

This minor slump in form continued against Reading the following weekend, United requiring a 73rd-minute equaliser from Cristiano Ronaldo to salvage a 1–1 draw. However, the Reds were not to be deterred and went on to win all four of their matches in October, starting with a 2–0 victory at home to Newcastle, both goals coming from Ole Solskjær. Wins against Wigan and arch-rivals Liverpool followed, and the month culminated with a 4–0 drubbing of Bolton Wanderers, Wayne Rooney scoring a hat-trick.

The winning streak went on for another three matches, against Portsmouth, Blackburn and Sheffield United, taking the total to seven consecutive wins before the visit of reigning champions Chelsea to the Theatre of Dreams. United got off to a flying start with two goalscoring chances coming early on, before Saha scored the opening goal in the 29th minute. The French striker picked up a defence-splitting pass from Wayne Rooney, before taking the ball onto his left foot and passing it around Ricardo Carvalho and beyond Carlo Cudicini's reach into the bottom-left corner of the net. The only other goal of the game fell to Ricardo Carvalho, securing a point for Chelsea and maintaining the Blues' three-point deficit behind United at the top of the table.

Following the Chelsea draw, United won another three games on the bounce, including a 3–1 victory in the Manchester derby, extending the Reds' unbeaten run to 12 games and their lead at the top of the table to 8 points. However, a 75th-minute Nigel Reo-Coker goal for West Ham United brought about only United's second defeat of the season, and allowed Chelsea to close the gap at the top to two points. Nevertheless, the Red Devils recovered, bouncing back from that defeat and beating Aston Villa 3–0 away from home. The match had many highlights, not least of which were Cristiano Ronaldo's dazzling form and a 25-yard volleyed goal from Paul Scholes, which was voted as the BBC's goal of the month for December 2006.

Ronaldo's contribution did not stop with his two goals against Villa, as he scored two more braces in his next two league games against Wigan and Reading. In fact, the Portuguese youngster won five out of the six Man of the Match awards for December, and he was named the Player of the Month for December.

The club's form was not immediately transferred into the new year as the Reds failed to beat Newcastle on New Year's Day, and then lost to Arsenal three weeks later. Fortunately, these two results were punctuated by emphatic wins over Aston Villa (3–1) and Watford (4–0). January 2007 also saw the arrival of Celtic and Sweden legend Henrik Larsson at Old Trafford. The striker was brought in to bolster United's thin strike force, of which the only fit members at the time were Wayne Rooney, Louis Saha and Ole Gunnar Solskjær, whose increasing age and long-term knee injury caused him to be restricted to substitute appearances at the most.

February began with a trip to White Hart Lane to take on Tottenham. The match began slowly, with United having to wait until just before half-time for their first goal, a Cristiano Ronaldo penalty. Nemanja Vidić scored the second just after the break, before Paul Scholes and Ryan Giggs rounded off United's second four-goal haul in the space of a week. Unfortunately, the match ended badly for Edwin van der Sar, as he broke his nose bravely going into a challenge with Robbie Keane. United had already used all three of their substitutions, and were forced to put John O'Shea in goal. The Irish defender committed himself well to the task, and managed to keep a clean sheet, including one desperate save in a one-on-one with Robbie Keane.

After a 2–0 victory over Charlton, an away match at Fulham followed at the end of the month. Brian McBride put the Cottagers 1–0 up after 17 minutes, but Ryan Giggs managed to keep the Reds in the game with an equaliser just before the half-hour mark. Going into the last five minutes, the match looked like it was going to finish as a draw, and with Chelsea not playing that weekend, United couldn't afford to allow them any ground. Then, with two minutes to go, Cristiano Ronaldo received the ball near the halfway line and burst past the challenges of Moritz Volz and Clint Dempsey, before cutting into the area and smashing the ball along the ground into the bottom right hand corner of the net. The result put United nine points clear of Chelsea with ten games left in the season.

United then travelled to Anfield to face Liverpool in their next game. Despite losing Wayne Rooney through injury and having Paul Scholes sent off for a late clash with Xabi Alonso, John O'Shea gave United a winner in injury time after Pepe Reina had fumbled Cristiano Ronaldo's free kick. Edwin van der Sar had previously saved brilliantly from Peter Crouch. Sir Alex Ferguson celebrated the winner in his own unique fashion on the touchline, and it was easy to see why after his side had somehow fashioned a crucial three points.

Following the win at Anfield, United hosted Bolton Wanderers in their next game. United lost injured Gary Neville early on, but Park Ji-sung slid home from close-range after 14 minutes. The brilliant Cristiano Ronaldo ran through before setting up Rooney to chip in the second and then Park bundled home a third before the break. Rooney struck home again through a crashing volley. Gary Speed pulled a goal back with an 87th-minute penalty, but it was nothing more than a consolation goal for Bolton.

United ended March with another 4–1 home win, this time against Blackburn Rovers. Nemanja Vidić was forced off with a broken collarbone, and the visitors found themselves a goal up a minute later, when Matt Derbyshire slotted home. Paul Scholes equalised when he fired in after 61 minutes, and a side-footed goal from Michael Carrick gave United the lead. Park pounced to add a third and an Ole Gunnar Solskjær drive completed United's comeback.

United opened April with a 2–1 loss to Portsmouth at Fratton Park. Matt Taylor gave Pompey the lead after Edwin van der Sar could only parry Benjani's shot. United pushed forward but David James denied Cristiano Ronaldo and Ryan Giggs before Rio Ferdinand put Taylor's pass into his own net to put Pompey 2-0 up. John O'Shea replied with a goal from close range, but James denied United a last-gasp equaliser after saving from Alan Smith.

United opened a six-point advantage over rivals Chelsea with a comfortable home win against Sheffield United. Michael Carrick gave United the lead after four minutes, lifting Cristiano Ronaldo's pass over the advancing Paddy Kenny. Wayne Rooney doubled United's lead with an emphatic finish after 50 minutes. Michael Tonge came closest for the Blades, hitting the bar with a curling 20-yard drive two minutes from time.

United dropped two points in the title race with Chelsea with 1–1 draw at home with Middlesbrough. United took an early lead when Kieran Richardson slotted home after Wayne Rooney had collected Paul Scholes' pass and rounded Boro keeper Mark Schwarzer. However, in stoppage time in the first half, Boro got a deserved equaliser, as Mark Viduka's diving header beat Edwin van der Sar. United struggled to break Boro down after the break and were indebted to Van der Sar's save to thwart Viduka.

United finished April with a 4–2 win over Everton at Goodison Park, moving five points clear in the title race. Everton took the lead on 12 minutes when Alan Stubbs' free-kick was deflected in off Michael Carrick. On 50 minutes, Manuel Fernandes smashed into the top corner to double their lead but John O'Shea halved it when he swept in after Iain Turner's error. An own goal from United old boy Phil Neville levelled the scores before Wayne Rooney put United ahead and Chris Eagles sealed the win. The result meant United moved two points further away from Chelsea, who were held by Bolton 2-2, with three games to play.

Manchester United moved to within touching distance of the Premiership title after Cristiano Ronaldo's penalty gave them victory at Manchester City in United's first match in May. Ronaldo scored in the 34th minute after he was fouled by Michael Ball, who had earlier stamped viciously on him. City wasted their best chance when goalkeeper Edwin van der Sar saved Darius Vassell's penalty 11 minutes from time after Wes Brown fouled Ball. The following day, Chelsea's failure to beat Arsenal handed the title to United for the first time since 2003. It was also United's 9th Premiership title, and their 16th overall.

United played out a 0–0 draw against Chelsea at Stamford Bridge on 9 May. United boss Sir Alex Ferguson and Chelsea counterpart José Mourinho both fielded weakened sides, resting their senior players for the FA Cup Final (which Chelsea eventually won 1–0). Chelsea looked more likely winners in what was mostly a low-key encounter. United goalkeeper Tomasz Kuszczak was erratic, but made several saves and Kieran Lee also cleared off the line from Ben Sahar in the closing minutes.

United finished their FA Premier League campaign with a 1–0 loss to West Ham United, who retained their Premier League status with a close range goal at half time from Carlos Tevez. Manchester United wasted a string of chances as West Ham fought fiercely for their top-flight status at the expense of Sheffield United, who lost to Wigan. West Ham stood firm to pull-off an amazing relegation escape and spoil Sir Alex Ferguson's title party.

Date	Opponents	H / A	Result F–A	Scorers	Attendance	League position
20 August 2006	Fulham	H	5–1	Saha 8', Pearce 14' (o.g.), Rooney (2) 16', 64', Ronaldo 19'	75,115	1st
23 August 2006	Charlton Athletic	A	3–0	Fletcher 49', Saha 80', Solskjær 90'	25,422	1st
26 August 2006	Watford	A	2–1	Silvestre 12', Giggs 52'	19,453	1st
9 September 2006	Tottenham Hotspur	H	1–0	Giggs 9'	75,453	1st
17 September 2006	Arsenal	H	0–1		75,595	2nd
23 September 2006	Reading	A	1–1	Ronaldo 73'	24,098	2nd
1 October 2006	Newcastle United	H	2–0	Solskjær (2) 41', 49'	75,664	1st
14 October 2006	Wigan Athletic	A	3–1	Vidić 62', Saha 66', Solskjær 90'	20,631	1st
22 October 2006	Liverpool	H	2–0	Scholes 39', Ferdinand 66'	75,828	1st
28 October 2006	Bolton Wanderers	A	4–0	Rooney (3) 10', 16', 89', Ronaldo 82'	27,229	1st
4 November 2006	Portsmouth	H	3–0	Saha 3' (pen.), Ronaldo 10', Vidić 66'	76,004	1st
11 November 2006	Blackburn Rovers	A	1–0	Saha 64'	26,162	1st
18 November 2006	Sheffield United	A	2–1	Rooney (2) 30', 75'	32,584	1st
26 November 2006	Chelsea	H	1–1	Saha 29'	75,948	1st
29 November 2006	Everton	H	3–0	Ronaldo 39', Evra 63', O'Shea 88'	75,723	1st
2 December 2006	Middlesbrough	A	2–1	Saha 19' (pen.), Fletcher 68'	31,238	1st
9 December 2006	Manchester City	H	3–1	Rooney 6', Saha 45', Ronaldo 84'	75,858	1st
17 December 2006	West Ham United	A	0–1		34,966	1st
23 December 2006	Aston Villa	A	3–0	Ronaldo (2) 58', 85', Scholes 64'	42,551	1st
26 December 2006	Wigan Athletic	H	3–1	Ronaldo (2) 47', 51', Solskjær 59'	76,018	1st
30 December 2006	Reading	H	3–2	Solskjær 33', Ronaldo (2) 59', 77'	75,910	1st
1 January 2007	Newcastle United	A	2–2	Scholes (2) 40', 46'	52,302	1st
13 January 2007	Aston Villa	H	3–1	Park 11', Carrick 13', Ronaldo 35'	76,078	1st
21 January 2007	Arsenal	A	1–2	Rooney 53'	60,128	1st
31 January 2007	Watford	H	4–0	Ronaldo 20' (pen.), Doyley 60' (o.g.), Larsson 70', Rooney 71'	76,032	1st
4 February 2007	Tottenham Hotspur	A	4–0	Ronaldo 45' (pen.), Vidić 48', Scholes 52', Giggs 77'	36,146	1st
10 February 2007	Charlton Athletic	H	2–0	Park 24', Fletcher 82'	75,883	1st
24 February 2007	Fulham	A	2–1	Giggs 29', Ronaldo 88'	24,459	1st
3 March 2007	Liverpool	A	1–0	O'Shea 90+1'	44,403	1st
17 March 2007	Bolton Wanderers	H	4–1	Park (2) 14', 25', Rooney (2) 17', 74'	76,058	1st
31 March 2007	Blackburn Rovers	H	4–1	Scholes 61', Carrick 72', Park 83', Solskjær 90'	76,098	1st
7 April 2007	Portsmouth	A	1–2	O'Shea 90'	20,223	1st
17 April 2007	Sheffield United	H	2–0	Carrick 4', Rooney 50'	75,540	1st
21 April 2007	Middlesbrough	H	1–1	Richardson 3'	75,967	1st
28 April 2007	Everton	A	4–2	O'Shea 61', P. Neville 68' (o.g.), Rooney 79', Eagles 90'	38,610	1st
5 May 2007	Manchester City	A	1–0	Ronaldo 34' (pen.)	47,244	1st
9 May 2007	Chelsea	A	0–0		41,794	1st
13 May 2007	West Ham United	H	0–1		75,927	1st

Pos	Team	Pld	W	D	L	GF	GA	GD	Pts	Qualification or relegation
1	Manchester United (C)	38	28	5	5	83	27	+56	89	Qualification for the Champions League group stage
2	Chelsea	38	24	11	3	64	24	+40	83	Qualification for the Champions League group stage
3	Liverpool	38	20	8	10	57	27	+30	68	Qualification for the Champions League third qualifying round
4	Arsenal	38	19	11	8	63	35	+28	68	Qualification for the Champions League third qualifying round
5	Tottenham Hotspur	38	17	9	12	57	54	+3	60	Qualification for the UEFA Cup first round (Note: Since both finalists of the FA Cup (Manchester United and Chelsea) and the League Cup winners (Chelsea) were qualified for the Champions League, their UEFA Cup spots were given to the 6th- and 7th-placed Premier League teams.)

Source: Barclays Premier League
Rules for classification: 1) points; 2) goal difference; 3) number of goals scored.
(C) Champions

== FA Cup ==
Manchester United opened their FA Cup campaign against Aston Villa. Henrik Larsson opened the scoring ten minutes into the second half with a fine volley, his first goal in a Manchester United shirt. Ryan Giggs almost doubled United's lead when his free-kick hit the crossbar, before Villa substitute Milan Baroš equalised, when he slid a low shot in the corner. However, Ole Gunnar Solskjær gave United a last-minute winner, when an error from Gábor Király allowed Solskjær to score with a tame shot.

United booked a place in the fifth round of the FA Cup with a 2–1 victory over Portsmouth. United were denied a goal when a header from Nemanja Vidić crossed the line before being cleared by Pedro Mendes. Portsmouth were under the cosh for most of the game but hung on until Wayne Rooney came off the bench on the hour mark. Rooney tapped in a cross from Ryan Giggs to break the 0–0 deadlock, before doubling United's lead with an audacious chip over the head of David James. Nwankwo Kanu grabbed a consolation in the 87th minute when a shot from Mendes deflected off the Nigerian and Tomasz Kuszczak.

In the fifth round, United met Reading, who were managed by former Red Steve Coppell. The match was played on 17 February. Michael Carrick unleashed a shot from outside the edge of the box that rocketed past Adam Federici into the net to give United a first-half lead. Cristiano Ronaldo had three shots on goal in the opening minutes of the second half, but all of them went wide. Brynjar Gunnarsson scored against the run of play in the 67th minute to equalise for Reading, when he powered a header past Tomasz Kuszczak. Coppell's side managed to hold United to a draw and salvage a replay.

The replay against Reading was played on 27 February. Three goals in the first six minutes gave United a 3–2 victory. Gabriel Heinze opened the scoring after two minutes, when his 25-yard shot squeezed under Adam Federici's body. Louis Saha rifled in an angled volley to make it 2–0, before Ole Gunnar Solskjær slotted home a third. Reading pulled one back through Dave Kitson's header before Leroy Lita's late strike ensured a thrilling finish.

United met Middlesbrough in the quarter-finals of the FA Cup. The game was played on 10 March. Wayne Rooney put United ahead after 23 minutes with a low drive, but Lee Cattermole volleyed Boro level on the half-time point. George Boateng headed in Middlesbrough's second a minute after half-time, but then handled Rio Ferdinand's header in the 66th minute. Cristiano Ronaldo converted the subsequent penalty to hand United a replay.

The replay against Middlesbrough was played on 19 March. The game was at a 0–0 stalemate until the 76th minute, when Cristiano Ronaldo once again converted from the penalty spot. The penalty was awarded when the winger was chopped down by behind from Jonathan Woodgate. The impressive Mark Schwarzer had twice thwarted Wayne Rooney when the striker had been put clean through with Boro on the back foot throughout. Boro substitute James Morrison was sent-off in injury time for a reckless lunge on Ronaldo. United won the game 1–0 to send them through to the last four.

United booked a ticket in the FA Cup Final with a 4–1 win over Watford. Wayne Rooney opened the scoring when he fired home an excellent 20-yard drive after just six minutes, but Watford equalised through Hamer Bouazza's overhead kick in the 26th minute. United restored their lead two minutes later when Cristiano Ronaldo bundled in Rooney's cross, and Rooney wrapped up the win with a close finish after 66 minutes. Substitute Kieran Richardson chipped in a fourth to secure United's place in the final.

United lost the FA Cup Final, the first FA Cup Final to be played at the new Wembley Stadium, 1–0 to Chelsea. The game was goal-less after 90 minutes, and looked set to be going towards penalties until Didier Drogba poked home a late winner in the 116th minute. Receiving Mikel John Obi's pass, Drogba clipped the ball to Frank Lampard before spinning into the box. The England midfielder delivered the perfect volleyed return to Drogba who nipped ahead of Edwin van der Sar before poking home. Chelsea tried to halt a United comeback, which was virtually impossible, for which Chelsea received three yellow cards. United could not find a goal to pull back, thus meaning that Chelsea were the first FA Cup winners at the new Wembley.

Date	Round	Opponents	H / A	Result F–A	Scorers	Attendance
7 January 2007	Round 3	Aston Villa	H	2–1	Larsson 55', Solskjær 90+1'	74,924
27 January 2007	Round 4	Portsmouth	H	2–1	Rooney (2) 77', 83'	71,137
17 February 2007	Round 5	Reading	H	1–1	Carrick 45'	70,608
27 February 2007	Round 5 Replay	Reading	A	3–2	Heinze 2', Saha 4', Solskjær 6'	23,821
10 March 2007	Round 6	Middlesbrough	A	2–2	Rooney 23', Ronaldo 68' (pen.)	33,308
19 March 2007	Round 6 Replay	Middlesbrough	H	1–0	Ronaldo 76' (pen.)	61,325
14 April 2007	Semi-final	Watford	N	4–1	Rooney (2) 7', 66', Ronaldo 28', Richardson 82'	37,425
19 May 2007	Final	Chelsea	N	0–1 (a.e.t.)		89,826

== League Cup ==
As one of the eight FA Premier League teams involved in European competition in the 2006–07 season, Manchester United entered the League Cup in the third round. United were also the defending champions of the League Cup. The draw took place on 23 September, and United were given an away tie with Football League One side Crewe Alexandra. The match was played on 25 October, and United won 2–1 after extra time. United went ahead through Ole Gunnar Solskjær's 26th-minute strike, but the hosts grabbed an equaliser, when Luke Varney beat Tomasz Kuszczak in the 73rd minute to send the game to extra time. Substitute Kieran Lee struck a winner two minutes before the end, when he slid home Alan Smith's through ball.

The draw for the Fourth Round took place on 25 October, and United were given an away tie with Football League Championship side Southend United. The match was played on 7 November. However, Southend pulled off an upset win by winning 1–0 and dumping the holders out of the League Cup. The struggling Championship side booked their place in the Fifth Round thanks to a 30-yard free-kick from Freddy Eastwood in the 27th minute. United tried to respond, but Cristiano Ronaldo was denied by two saves from Darryl Flahavan. David Jones' drive then crashed against the post before John O'Shea saw Flahavan tip over his cross-shot. Southend clung on for a shock win.

Date	Round	Opponents	H / A	Result F–A	Scorers	Attendance
25 October 2006	Round 3	Crewe Alexandra	A	2–1 (a.e.t.)	Solskjær 26', Lee 119'	10,046
7 November 2006	Round 4	Southend United	A	0–1		11,532

== UEFA Champions League ==
=== Group stage ===
The draw for the group stage of the Champions League took place on 24 August 2006. As one of the eight top ranked teams in Europe, Manchester United would avoid being drawn against defending champions Barcelona. They would also avoid facing Inter Milan, Real Madrid, Milan, the other English teams (Arsenal, Liverpool, and Chelsea (who were in Pot 2, but would still avoid facing United due to the 'country protection rule')), and others. However, they could still be drawn against FC Bayern Munich, PSV, Celtic and others. Eventually, United were drawn against Celtic, Benfica and Copenhagen.

United opened their 2006–07 UEFA Champions League campaign with an entertaining 3–2 victory over Celtic on 13 September. Jan Vennegoor of Hesselink gave Celtic the lead with a low shot after 21 minutes. However, United equalised with a Louis Saha penalty, awarded when Celtic keeper Artur Boruc fouled Ryan Giggs, and United took the lead when Saha swept home both his and United's second goal. A free-kick from Shunsuke Nakamura pulled Celtic level, but an awful mistake from Thomas Gravesen just seconds into the second half allowed Ole Gunnar Solskjær to score a third goal for United.

United then travelled to face Benfica at the Estádio da Luz on 26 September. Despite being outplayed during the first half, while Nuno Gomes just off target, United – who were wearing their white change kit – took the lead through Louis Saha, who struck with a rising angled drive on the hour mark, giving United their first away win in the UEFA Champions League for almost three years. United took control after the goal, and forced Benfica keeper Quim into several fine saves in the dying stages.

For the first of their two matches with Copenhagen, United hosted the Danish champions at Old Trafford on 17 October. United won 3–0. Paul Scholes fire United ahead from 25 yards six minutes before the break, and John O'Shea doubled United's lead seconds after the break, when he bundled home Cristiano Ronaldo's corner. Poor goalkeeping from Jesper Christiansen allowed a tame shot from substitute Kieran Richardson to slide in eight minutes from time.

The return leg against FC Copenhagen was played on 1 November. A weakened United side lost 1–0. Former Aston Villa striker Marcus Allbäck poked home the winner after 73 minutes to leave United with more work needed to reach the knockout phase. And Sir Alex Ferguson's side had only themselves to blame for a lacklustre approach and a host of missed chances. John O'Shea and Wayne Rooney both wasted easy opportunities to score.

A second successive 1–0 loss, this time to Celtic, pushed United down to second place in Group F and qualified the Scottish champions for the UEFA Champions League knockout phase. Shunsuke Nakamura scored the only goal with nine minutes to go, when he curled a sweet 30-yard strike into the top corner of the net. United striker Louis Saha was guilty of a terrible miss when he appeared to assume he was offside. Things got worse for Saha when Celtic keeper Artur Boruc saved the Frenchman's last-minute penalty.

United qualified for the UEFA Champions League knockout phase as winners of Group F with a 3–1 victory over Benfica. Benfica took the lead midway through the first half when Nélson drilled in a 25-yard stunner. Nemanja Vidić drew United level with a fine header in stoppage time at the end of the first half, and Ryan Giggs put United ahead with another header, before Louis Saha finished off the scoring from 12 yards.

Date	Opponents	H / A	Result F–A	Scorers	Attendance	Group position
13 September 2006	Celtic	H	3–2	Saha 30' (pen.), 40', Solskjær 47'	74,031	1st
26 September 2006	Benfica	A	1–0	Saha 60'	61,000	1st
17 October 2006	Copenhagen	H	3–0	Scholes 39', O'Shea 46', Richardson 83'	72,020	1st
1 November 2006	Copenhagen	A	0–1		40,000	1st
21 November 2006	Celtic	A	0–1		60,632	2nd
6 December 2006	Benfica	H	3–1	Vidić 45+1', Giggs 61', Saha 75'	74,955	1st

Pos	Team	Pld	W	D	L	GF	GA	GD	Pts	Qualification	MUN	CEL	BEN	CPH
1	(England) Manchester United	6	4	0	2	10	5	+5	12	Advance to knockout stage	—	3–2	3–1	3–0
2	(Scotland) Celtic	6	3	0	3	8	9	−1	9	Advance to knockout stage	1–0	—	3–0	1–0
3	(Portugal) Benfica	6	2	1	3	7	8	−1	7	Transfer to UEFA Cup	0–1	3–0	—	3–1
4	(Denmark) Copenhagen	6	2	1	3	5	8	−3	7		1–0	3–1	0–0	—

Source: RSSSF

=== Knockout phase ===
The draw for the first knockout round of the Champions League was made on 15 December 2006 in Nyon, Switzerland. Manchester United, as group winners, could have faced teams such as Barcelona and Internazionale, but were eventually paired with Lille, whom they met in the group stage of last season's UEFA Champions League.

The first leg was played on 20 February 2007. United won 1–0, thanks to a controversial Ryan Giggs goal in the 83rd minute. Giggs curled in a quick free kick in the 83rd minute while the Lille players were still assembling their defensive wall. Lille players, furious that an earlier header by Peter Odemwingie had been ruled out, walked off the pitch as the last 16 first leg clash boiled over. They eventually returned, and United clung on for a crucial victory.

United propelled into the last eight of the UEFA Champions League thanks to a Henrik Larsson goal in the return game against Lille, played on 7 March. The Swedish forward was playing his final game at Old Trafford in a Manchester United shirt. In the first half, United had two good chances, but Wayne Rooney's shot was blocked and John O'Shea hit the bar. Lille grew in confidence but failed to capitalise as Jean Makoun wasted a header from six yards and Peter Odemwingie's header rattled the post. Larsson sealed victory in the 72nd minute when he headed home Cristiano Ronaldo's cross from the left.

The draw for the final stages, including the quarter-finals, semi-finals and final, was held on Friday, 9 March 2007 in Athens, Greece. United were paired with Roma. The first leg took place on 4 April, and the second leg took place on 10 April. United and Roma were put on the same side of the draw with Milan and Bayern Munich, meaning that United will play either of the teams if they beat Roma.

In the first leg of the quarter-final with Roma, Paul Scholes was sent off in the 33rd minute, after fouls on Christian Wilhelmsson and Francesco Totti. Rodrigo Taddei gave Roma the lead with a deflected shot in the 44th minute. Wayne Rooney equalised coolly with his first UEFA Champions League goal since 2004, but Mirko Vučinić slid in Roma's second after 66 minutes for a slender lead.

However, the 2–1 loss to Roma was made redundant with a 7–1 thrashing of Roma in the second leg of the quarter-final. Michael Carrick curled in United's opener and Alan Smith fired home before Wayne Rooney added their third of the night, finishing off a superb move. Cristiano Ronaldo smashed home the fourth goal into the bottom corner and slid home a Ryan Giggs cross before Carrick fired home the sixth. Roma grabbed a consolation goal through Daniele De Rossi before Patrice Evra's low shot finished the scoring.

Meanwhile, a 2–2 draw at the San Siro and a 2–0 win at the Allianz Arena confirmed Milan's status as United's semi-final opponents. Manchester United's semi-final first leg, played on 24 April, was at home to Milan, and the game ended 3–2 to United. Cristiano Ronaldo gave United the lead with a fifth-minute header, but Kaká drew Milan level with an angled drive after 21 minutes, and gave Milan the lead from close range before the break. Wayne Rooney then turned in Paul Schole's cool pass on the hour to equalise, and won the game for United in the last minute, when he lashed a glorious 20-yard finish past Dida.

The return leg against Milan was played on 2 May at the San Siro. Despite winning the first leg, United lost 3–0. Milan were ahead on away goals in the 11th minute, when Clarence Seedorf headed down for Kaká to drill into the corner. Seedorf capitalised on confusion in the United defence to fire in a second after half an hour. And substitute Alberto Gilardino broke away to wrap up an easy win as United were eliminated from the Champions League.

Date	Round	Opponents	H / A	Result F–A	Scorers	Attendance
20 February 2007	First knockout round First leg	Lille	A	1–0	Giggs 83'	41,000
7 March 2007	First knockout round Second leg	Lille	H	1–0	Larsson 72'	75,182
4 April 2007	Quarter-final; First leg	Roma	A	1–2	Rooney 60'	77,000
10 April 2007	Quarter-final; Second leg	Roma	H	7–1	Carrick (2) 11', 60', Smith 17', Rooney 19'; Ronaldo (2) 44', 49', Evra 81'	74,476
24 April 2007	Semi-final; First leg	Milan	H	3–2	Ronaldo 5', Rooney (2) 59', 90+1'	73,820
2 May 2007	Semi-final; Second leg	Milan	A	0–3		78,500

== Squad statistics ==
No.	Pos.	Name	League		FA Cup		League Cup		Europe		Total	
No.	Pos.	Name	Apps	Goals	Apps	Goals	Apps	Goals	Apps	Goals	Apps	Goals
1	GK	(Netherlands) Edwin van der Sar	32	0	3	0	0	0	12	0	47	0
2	DF	(England) Gary Neville (c)	24	0	3	0	0	0	6	0	33	0
3	DF	(France) Patrice Evra	22(2)	1	3(1)	0	0(1)	0	4(3)	1	29(7)	2
4	DF	(Argentina) Gabriel Heinze	17(5)	0	6	1	2	0	7(1)	0	32(6)	1
5	DF	(England) Rio Ferdinand	33	1	7	0	0	0	8(1)	0	47(1)	1
6	DF	(England) Wes Brown	17(5)	0	6	0	2	0	7	0	32(5)	0
7	MF	(Portugal) Cristiano Ronaldo	31(3)	17	6(1)	3	1	0	11	3	49(4)	23
8	FW	(England) Wayne Rooney	33(2)	14	5(2)	5	1	0	12	4	51(4)	23
9	FW	(France) Louis Saha	18(6)	8	2	1	0	0	5(3)	4	25(9)	13
11	MF	(Wales) Ryan Giggs (vc)	25(5)	4	6	0	0	0	8	2	39(5)	6
13	MF	(South Korea) Park Ji-sung	8(6)	5	4(1)	0	0	0	0(1)	0	12(8)	5
14	FW	(England) Alan Smith	6(3)	0	2(1)	0	2	0	1(3)	1	11(7)	1
15	DF	(Serbia) Nemanja Vidić	25	3	5	0	0	0	8	1	38	4
16	MF	(England) Michael Carrick	29(4)	3	7	1	0	0	12	2	48(4)	6
17	FW	(Sweden) Henrik Larsson	5(2)	1	3(1)	1	0	0	2	1	10(3)	3
18	MF	(England) Paul Scholes	29(1)	6	3(1)	0	0	0	10(1)	1	42(3)	7
20	FW	(Norway) Ole Gunnar Solskjær	9(10)	7	3(3)	2	1	1	2(4)	1	15(17)	11
21	FW	(China) Dong Fangzhuo	1	0	0	0	0	0	0	0	1	0
22	DF	(Republic of Ireland) John O'Shea	16(16)	4	2(3)	0	1	0	8(3)	1	27(22)	5
23	MF	(England) Kieran Richardson	8(7)	1	2(1)	1	2	0	0(4)	1	12(12)	3
24	MF	(Scotland) Darren Fletcher	16(8)	3	3(3)	0	1	0	6(3)	0	26(14)	3
25	MF	(England) David Jones	0	0	0	0	2	0	0	0	2	0
27	DF	(France) Mikaël Silvestre	6(8)	1	2	0	2	0	3	0	13(8)	1
29	GK	(Poland) Tomasz Kuszczak	6	0	5	0	2	0	0	0	13	0
33	MF	(England) Chris Eagles	1(1)	1	0	0	0	0	0	0	1(1)	1
34	DF	(Wales) Ryan Shawcross	0	0	0	0	0(2)	0	0	0	0(2)	0
35	DF	(England) Kieran Lee	1	0	0	0	0(2)	1	0	0	1(2)	1
36	DF	(Scotland) David Gray	0	0	0	0	1	0	0	0	1	0
41	FW	(England) Phil Marsh	0	0	0	0	1	0	0	0	1	0
42	MF	(England) Michael Barnes	0	0	0	0	0(1)	0	0	0	0(1)	0
49	MF	(England) Ritchie Jones	0	0	0	0	1	0	0	0	1	0

== Transfers ==
United's first departure of the 2006–07 season was French forward David Bellion, who departed for Nice for an undisclosed fee on 1 July. A fortnight later, Sylvan Ebanks-Blake signed for Plymouth Argyle for £200,000. A fortnight after the departure of Ebanks-Blake, striker Ruud van Nistelrooy left for Real Madrid. On 10 August, defender Paul McShane and goalkeeper Luke Steele both departed for West Bromwich Albion. At the end of August, Liam Miller signed for Sunderland.

United's only permanent arrival in the whole of the 2006–07 season was Michael Carrick, who signed from Tottenham Hotspur on 31 July for £13 million, although Polish goalkeeper Tomasz Kuszczak joined from West Bromwich Albion on an initial season-long loan, while Swedish striker Henrik Larsson came in on a 10-week loan from Helsingborg in January 2007.

During the winter transfer window, David Jones and Tim Howard left United after both had served four years at the club.

=== In ===
Date	Pos.	Name	From	Fee
31 July 2006	MF	(England) Michael Carrick	(England) Tottenham Hotspur	Undisclosed

=== Out ===
Date	Pos.	Name	To	Fee
1 July 2006	FW	(France) David Bellion	(France) Nice	£5.25m
14 July 2006	FW	(England) Sylvan Ebanks-Blake	(England) Plymouth Argyle	£200k
26 July 2006	MF	(South Africa) Quinton Fortune	(England) Bolton Wanderers	Free
28 July 2006	FW	(Netherlands) Ruud van Nistelrooy	(Spain) Real Madrid	£10.2m
10 August 2006	DF	(Republic of Ireland) Paul McShane	(England) West Bromwich Albion	£1.5m
10 August 2006	GK	(England) Luke Steele	(England) West Bromwich Albion	£170k
31 August 2006	MF	(Republic of Ireland) Liam Miller	(England) Sunderland	Free
3 January 2007	MF	(England) David Jones	(England) Derby County	£1m

=== Loan in ===
Date from	Date to	Position	Name	From
10 August 2006	30 June 2007	GK	(Poland) Tomasz Kuszczak	(England) West Bromwich Albion
2 January 2007	12 March 2007	FW	(Sweden) Henrik Larsson	(Sweden) Helsingborg

=== Loan out ===
Date from	Date to	Position	Name	To
1 July 2006	30 June 2007	GK	(United States) Tim Howard	(England) Everton
4 August 2006	30 June 2007	DF	(Spain) Gerard Piqué	(Spain) Real Zaragoza
4 August 2006	10 August 2006	GK	(England) Luke Steele	(England) Coventry City
10 August 2006	1 January 2007	DF	(England) Adam Eckersley	(Denmark) Brøndby
10 August 2006	30 June 2007	GK	(England) Ben Foster	(England) Watford
11 August 2006	29 December 2006	MF	(England) Lee Martin	(Scotland) Rangers
16 August 2006	28 December 2006	DF	(England) Phil Bardsley	(Scotland) Rangers
17 August 2006	30 June 2007	FW	(England) Fraizer Campbell	(Belgium) Royal Antwerp
17 August 2006	1 January 2007	DF	(Northern Ireland) Jonny Evans	(Belgium) Royal Antwerp
17 August 2006	30 June 2007	MF	(Republic of Ireland) Darron Gibson	(Belgium) Royal Antwerp
17 August 2006	1 January 2007	DF	(England) Danny Simpson	(Belgium) Royal Antwerp
31 August 2006	1 January 2007	MF	(England) Chris Eagles	(Netherlands) NEC
31 August 2006	1 January 2007	FW	(Italy) Giuseppe Rossi	(England) Newcastle United
28 October 2006	27 November 2006	MF	(England) Ritchie Jones	(England) Colchester United
17 November 2006	3 January 2007	MF	(England) David Jones	(England) Derby County
4 January 2007	30 June 2007	DF	(Northern Ireland) Jonny Evans	(England) Sunderland
4 January 2007	9 May 2007	MF	(England) Danny Rose	(England) Oxford United
4 January 2007	30 June 2007	DF	(Wales) Ryan Shawcross	(Belgium) Royal Antwerp
5 January 2007	30 June 2007	DF	(Scotland) David Gray	(Belgium) Royal Antwerp
8 January 2007	19 May 2007	DF	(England) Phil Bardsley	(England) Aston Villa
8 January 2007	30 June 2007	DF	(England) Adam Eckersley	(England) Barnsley
18 January 2007	30 June 2007	FW	(Italy) Giuseppe Rossi	(Italy) Parma
25 January 2007	30 June 2007	MF	(England) Lee Martin	(England) Stoke City
29 January 2007	30 June 2007	DF	(England) Danny Simpson	(England) Sunderland
12 February 2007	7 May 2007	MF	(England) Ritchie Jones	(England) Barnsley
