= 2003–04 Manchester United F.C. season =

English football club season

Manchester United
2003–04 season
- Chairman: Sir Roy Gardner
- Manager: Sir Alex Ferguson
- Stadium: Old Trafford
- Premier League: 3rd
- FA Cup: Winners
- League Cup: Fourth round
- UEFA Champions League: Round of 16
- Community Shield: Winners
- Top goalscorer: League: Ruud van Nistelrooy (20); All: Ruud van Nistelrooy (30)
- Highest home attendance: 67,758 vs Southampton (31 January 2004)
- Lowest home attendance: 66,520 vs Panathinaikos (16 September 2003)
- Average home league attendance: 67,641
Home colours	Away colours	Third colours

The 2003–04 season was Manchester United's 12th season in the Premier League, and their 29th consecutive season in the top division of English football.

United started the season by winning the 2003 FA Community Shield and then secured a record eleventh FA Cup with a 3–0 win over Millwall at the Millennium Stadium in Cardiff. However, the club surrendered the Premier League title to unbeaten champions Arsenal, with a second-half dip in league form coinciding with Rio Ferdinand starting an eight-month ban from football due to a missed drugs test and restricting United to a third-place finish.

New to the United side were Portuguese winger Cristiano Ronaldo, Brazilian 2002 FIFA World Cup-winning midfielder Kléberson, American goalkeeper Tim Howard, Cameroonian midfielder Eric Djemba-Djemba and French striker David Bellion.

United's UEFA Champions League and League Cup dreams ended in the last 16, with the European exit being particularly painful as a last minute goal by eventual champions Porto put them out of the competition and denied them an eighth successive Champions League quarter-final.

== Pre-season and friendlies ==
Date	Opponents	H/A	Result F–A	Scorers	Attendance
22 July 2003	Celtic	N	4–0	Van Nistelrooy 7', Giggs 27', Solskjær 39', Bellion 72'	66,722
27 July 2003	Club América	N	3–1	Van Nistelrooy 48', Forlán (2) 49', 80'	57,365
31 July 2003	Juventus	N	4–1	Giggs 25', Scholes 57', Van Nistelrooy 60', Solskjær 79'	79,000
3 August 2003	Barcelona	N	3–1	Forlán (2) 25', 37', Van Nistelrooy 85'	68,396
7 August 2003	Sporting CP	A	1–3	Hugo 88' (o.g.)	55,000
13 August 2003	Stoke City	A	1–3	Forlán 68'	21,436

== FA Community Shield ==
Date	Opponents	H/A	Result F–A	Scorers	Attendance
10 August 2003	Arsenal	N	1–1 (4–3p)	Silvestre 15'	59,293

== FA Premier League ==
Date	Opponents	H/A	Result F–A	Scorers	Attendance	League position
16 August 2003	Bolton Wanderers	H	4–0	Giggs (2) 35', 74', Scholes 77', Van Nistelrooy 87'	67,647	2nd
23 August 2003	Newcastle United	A	2–1	Van Nistelrooy 51', Scholes 59'	52,165	3rd
27 August 2003	Wolverhampton Wanderers	H	1–0	O'Shea 10'	67,648	2nd
31 August 2003	Southampton	A	0–1		32,066	2nd
13 September 2003	Charlton Athletic	A	2–0	Van Nistelrooy (2) 62', 82'	26,078	2nd
21 September 2003	Arsenal	H	0–0		67,639	3rd
27 September 2003	Leicester City	A	4–1	Keane 15', Van Nistelrooy (3) 16', 45', 52'	32,044	3rd
4 October 2003	Birmingham City	H	3–0	Van Nistelrooy 36' (pen.), Scholes 57', Giggs 82'	67,633	2nd
18 October 2003	Leeds United	A	1–0	Keane 81'	40,153	2nd
25 October 2003	Fulham	H	1–3	Forlán 45'	67,727	3rd
1 November 2003	Portsmouth	H	3–0	Forlán 37', Ronaldo 80', Keane 82'	67,639	3rd
9 November 2003	Liverpool	A	2–1	Giggs (2) 58', 70'	44,159	3rd
22 November 2003	Blackburn Rovers	H	2–1	Van Nistelrooy 24', Kléberson 38'	67,748	3rd
30 November 2003	Chelsea	A	0–1		41,932	3rd
6 December 2003	Aston Villa	H	4–0	Van Nistelrooy (2) 16', 45', Forlán (2) 90', 90'	67,621	3rd
13 December 2003	Manchester City	H	3–1	Scholes (2) 7', 73', Van Nistelrooy 34'	67,645	2nd
21 December 2003	Tottenham Hotspur	A	2–1	O'Shea 15', Van Nistelrooy 26'	35,910	1st
26 December 2003	Everton	H	3–2	Butt 9', Kléberson 44', Bellion 68'	67,642	1st
28 December 2003	Middlesbrough	A	1–0	Fortune 14'	34,738	1st
7 January 2004	Bolton Wanderers	A	2–1	Scholes 24', Van Nistelrooy 39'	27,668	1st
11 January 2004	Newcastle United	H	0–0		67,622	1st
17 January 2004	Wolverhampton Wanderers	A	0–1		29,396	2nd
31 January 2004	Southampton	H	3–2	Saha 18', Scholes 37', Van Nistelrooy 61'	67,758	2nd
7 February 2004	Everton	A	4–3	Saha (2) 9', 29', Van Nistelrooy (2) 24', 89'	40,190	2nd
11 February 2004	Middlesbrough	H	2–3	Van Nistelrooy 45', Giggs 63'	67,346	2nd
21 February 2004	Leeds United	H	1–1	Scholes 64'	67,744	2nd
28 February 2004	Fulham	A	1–1	Saha 14'	18,306	3rd
14 March 2004	Manchester City	A	1–4	Scholes 35'	47,284	3rd
20 March 2004	Tottenham Hotspur	H	3–0	Giggs 30', Ronaldo 89', Bellion 90'	67,634	3rd
28 March 2004	Arsenal	A	1–1	Saha 86'	38,184	3rd
10 April 2004	Birmingham City	A	2–1	Ronaldo 60', Saha 78'	29,548	3rd
13 April 2004	Leicester City	H	1–0	G. Neville 56'	67,749	3rd
17 April 2004	Portsmouth	A	0–1		20,140	3rd
20 April 2004	Charlton Athletic	H	2–0	Saha 28', G. Neville 65'	67,477	3rd
24 April 2004	Liverpool	H	0–1		67,647	3rd
1 May 2004	Blackburn Rovers	A	0–1		29,616	3rd
8 May 2004	Chelsea	H	1–1	Van Nistelrooy 76'	67,609	3rd
15 May 2004	Aston Villa	A	2–0	Ronaldo 4', Van Nistelrooy 10'	42,573	3rd

Pos	Team	Pld	W	D	L	GF	GA	GD	Pts	Qualification or relegation
1	Arsenal (C)	38	26	12	0	73	26	+47	90	Qualification for the Champions League group stage
2	Chelsea	38	24	7	7	67	30	+37	79	Qualification for the Champions League group stage
3	Manchester United	38	23	6	9	64	35	+29	75	Qualification for the Champions League third qualifying round (Note: Since Manchester United qualified for the Champions League, their place in the UEFA Cup as 2003–04 FA Cup winners went to First Division club Millwall, who were the FA Cup runners-up.)
4	Liverpool	38	16	12	10	55	37	+18	60	Qualification for the Champions League third qualifying round
5	Newcastle United	38	13	17	8	52	40	+12	56	Qualification for the UEFA Cup first round

Source: Premier League
Rules for classification: 1) points; 2) goal difference; 3) number of goals scored.
(C) Champions

== FA Cup ==
Date	Round	Opponents	H/A	Result F–A	Scorers	Attendance
4 January 2004	Round 3	Aston Villa	A	2–1	Scholes (2) 64', 68'	40,371
25 January 2004	Round 4	Northampton Town	A	3–0	Silvestre 34', Hargreaves 47' (o.g.), Forlán 68'	7,356
14 February 2004	Round 5	Manchester City	H	4–2	Scholes 34', Van Nistelrooy (2) 71', 80', Ronaldo 74'	67,228
6 March 2004	Round 6	Fulham	H	2–1	Van Nistelrooy (2) 25', 62'	67,614
3 April 2004	Semi-final	Arsenal	N	1–0	Scholes 32'	39,939
22 May 2004	Final	Millwall	N	3–0	Ronaldo 44', Van Nistelrooy (2) 65' (pen.), 81'	71,350

== League Cup ==
Date	Round	Opponents	H/A	Result F–A	Scorers	Attendance
28 October 2003	Round 3	Leeds United	A	3–2 (a.e.t.)	Bellion 78', Forlán 108', Djemba-Djemba 117'	37,546
3 December 2003	Round 4	West Bromwich Albion	A	0–2		25,282

== UEFA Champions League ==
=== Group stage ===
Date	Opponents	H/A	Result F–A	Scorers	Attendance	Group position
16 September 2003	Panathinaikos	H	5–0	Silvestre 13', Fortune 15', Solskjær 33', Butt 40', Djemba-Djemba 83'	66,520	1st
1 October 2003	VfB Stuttgart	A	1–2	Van Nistelrooy 67' (pen.)	50,348	2nd
22 October 2003	Rangers	A	1–0	P. Neville 5'	48,730	1st
4 November 2003	Rangers	H	3–0	Forlán 6', Van Nistelrooy (2) 43', 60'	66,707	1st
26 November 2003	Panathinaikos	A	1–0	Forlán 85'	6,890	1st
9 December 2003	VfB Stuttgart	H	2–0	Van Nistelrooy 45', Giggs 58'	67,141	1st

Pos	Team	Pld	W	D	L	GF	GA	GD	Pts	Qualification
1	(England) Manchester United	6	5	0	1	13	2	+11	15	Advance to knockout stage
2	(Germany) VfB Stuttgart	6	4	0	2	9	6	+3	12	Advance to knockout stage
3	(Greece) Panathinaikos	6	1	1	4	5	13	−8	4	Transfer to UEFA Cup
4	(Scotland) Rangers	6	1	1	4	4	10	−6	4	

Source: RSSSF

=== Knockout phase ===
Date	Round	Opponents	H/A	Result F–A	Scorers	Attendance
25 February 2004	First knockout round First leg	Porto	A	1–2	Fortune 14'	49,977
9 March 2004	First knockout round Second leg	Porto	H	1–1	Scholes 32'	67,029

== Squad statistics ==
No.	Pos.	Name	League		FA Cup		League Cup		Europe		Other		Total	
No.	Pos.	Name	Apps	Goals	Apps	Goals	Apps	Goals	Apps	Goals	Apps	Goals	Apps	Goals
1	GK	(France) Fabien Barthez	0	0	0	0	0	0	0	0	0	0	0	0
2	DF	(England) Gary Neville	30	2	4	0	1	0	7	0	0	0	42	2
3	DF	(England) Phil Neville	29(2)	0	2(1)	0	1	0	7	1	1	0	40(3)	1
5	DF	(England) Rio Ferdinand	20	0	0	0	0	0	6	0	1	0	27	0
6	DF	(England) Wes Brown	15(2)	0	5(1)	0	0	0	2	0	0	0	22(3)	0
7	MF	(Portugal) Cristiano Ronaldo	15(14)	4	5	2	1	0	3(2)	0	0	0	24(16)	6
8	MF	(England) Nicky Butt	12(9)	1	3(2)	0	2	0	4(1)	1	1	0	22(12)	2
9	FW	(France) Louis Saha	9(3)	7	0	0	0	0	1(1)	0	0	0	10(4)	7
10	FW	(Netherlands) Ruud van Nistelrooy	31(1)	20	3(1)	6	0	0	7	4	1	0	42(2)	30
11	MF	(Wales) Ryan Giggs	29(4)	7	5	0	0	0	8	1	1	0	43(4)	8
12	FW	(France) David Bellion	4(10)	2	1(1)	0	2	1	0(4)	0	0	0	7(15)	3
13	GK	(Northern Ireland) Roy Carroll	6	0	2(1)	0	2	0	1	0	0	0	11(1)	0
14	GK	(United States) Tim Howard	32	0	4	0	0	0	7	0	1	0	44	0
15	MF	(Brazil) Kléberson	10(2)	2	1	0	1	0	1(1)	0	0	0	13(3)	2
16	MF	(Republic of Ireland) Roy Keane (c)	25(3)	3	4(1)	0	0	0	4	0	1	0	34(4)	3
17	GK	(Spain) Ricardo	0	0	0	0	0	0	0	0	0	0	0	0
18	MF	(England) Paul Scholes	24(4)	9	6	4	0	0	5	1	1	0	36(4)	14
19	MF	(Cameroon) Eric Djemba-Djemba	10(5)	0	0(1)	0	1	1	1(3)	1	0(1)	0	12(10)	2
20	FW	(Norway) Ole Gunnar Solskjær	7(6)	0	1(2)	0	0	0	1(1)	1	1	0	10(9)	1
21	FW	(Uruguay) Diego Forlán	10(14)	4	2	1	1	1	2(2)	2	0(1)	0	15(17)	8
22	DF	(Republic of Ireland) John O'Shea	32(1)	2	6	0	2	0	6(1)	0	0(1)	0	46(3)	2
23	MF	(England) Kieran Richardson	0	0	0(1)	0	2	0	0	0	0	0	2(1)	0
24	MF	(Scotland) Darren Fletcher	17(5)	0	4(1)	0	2	0	3(3)	0	0	0	26(9)	0
25	MF	(South Africa) Quinton Fortune	18(5)	1	3	0	1	0	6(1)	2	1	0	29(6)	3
26	MF	(England) Danny Pugh	0	0	0(1)	0	1	0	0	0	0	0	1(1)	0
27	DF	(France) Mikaël Silvestre	33(1)	0	5	1	0	0	6	1	1	1	45(1)	3
32	FW	(England) Eddie Johnson	0	0	0	0	0(1)	0	0	0	0	0	0(1)	0
33	MF	(England) Chris Eagles	0	0	0	0	0(2)	0	0	0	0	0	0(2)	0
34	DF	(England) Phil Bardsley	0	0	0(1)	0	1	0	0	0	0	0	1(1)	0
36	FW	(England) Daniel Nardiello	0	0	0	0	0(1)	0	0	0	0	0	0(1)	0
39	DF	(Republic of Ireland) Paul Tierney	0	0	0	0	1	0	0	0	0	0	1	0

== Transfers ==
United's first departure of the 2003–04 season was David Beckham, who left Old Trafford after ten years with the Red Devils. On 7 July, forward Danny Webber joined Watford. A month after Webber's departure, Argentinian midfielder, Juan Sebastián Verón joined United's rivals Chelsea. Two days later, English forward Jimmy Davis died in a car crash.

Coming in during the summer transfer window were French forward David Bellion, Cameroonian midfielder Eric Djemba-Djemba, American goalkeeper Tim Howard, Brazilian midfielder Kléberson, and Portuguese winger Cristiano Ronaldo.

Leaving in the winter transfer window was Alan Tate, who joined Swansea City. First-choice goalkeeper Fabien Barthez rejoined Marseille in April, while Danny Pugh joined Leeds United in late May, in exchange for Alan Smith.

Arriving in the winter transfer window was Louis Saha, who signed from Fulham on 23 January for a fee of £12.82 million. Alan Smith joined United on 26 May from Leeds United in exchange for Danny Pugh (see above). Gabriel Heinze joined United on 11 June from Paris Saint-Germain for a fee of £6.9 million.

=== In ===
Date	Pos.	Name	From	Fee
1 July 2003	FW	(France) David Bellion	(England) Sunderland	£2m
3 July 2003	MF	(Cameroon) Eric Djemba-Djemba	(France) Nantes	£3.5m
15 July 2003	GK	(United States) Tim Howard	(United States) MetroStars	£2.3m
12 August 2003	MF	(Brazil) Kléberson	(Brazil) Atlético Paranaense	£5.93m
12 August 2003	MF	(Portugal) Cristiano Ronaldo	(Portugal) Sporting CP	£12.24m
12 January 2004	FW	(China) Dong Fangzhuo	(China) Dalian Shide	£3.5m
23 January 2004	FW	(France) Louis Saha	(England) Fulham	£12.82m
26 May 2004	FW	(England) Alan Smith	(England) Leeds United	£7m
11 June 2004	DF	(Argentina) Gabriel Heinze	(France) Paris Saint-Germain	£6.9m

=== Out ===
Date	Pos.	Name	To	Fee
2 July 2003	MF	(England) David Beckham	(Spain) Real Madrid	£17.25m (Note: Beckham's transfer fee could increase to £24.25 million based on Real Madrid's performance in the UEFA Champions League over the four years of his contract.)
7 July 2003	FW	(England) Danny Webber	(England) Watford	Undisclosed
7 August 2003	MF	(Argentina) Juan Sebastián Verón	(England) Chelsea	£15m
9 August 2003	FW	(England) Jimmy Davis	Deceased	
6 February 2004	DF	(England) Alan Tate	(Wales) Swansea City	Undisclosed
27 April 2004	GK	(France) Fabien Barthez	(France) Marseille	£5m
26 May 2004	MF	(England) Danny Pugh	(England) Leeds United	Free

=== Loan out ===
Date from	Date to	Position	Name	To
8 July 2003	9 August 2003	FW	(England) Jimmy Davis	(England) Watford
10 July 2003	30 June 2004	MF	(England) Luke Chadwick	(England) Burnley
19 July 2003	30 June 2004	MF	(Sweden) Bojan Djordjic	(Serbia and Montenegro) Red Star Belgrade
27 July 2003	1 January 2004	FW	(England) Colin Heath	(Belgium) Royal Antwerp
27 July 2003	1 January 2004	MF	(England) David Fox	(Belgium) Royal Antwerp
29 July 2003	30 June 2004	MF	(Scotland) Michael Stewart	(England) Nottingham Forest
24 August 2003	30 June 2004	GK	(Spain) Ricardo	(Spain) Racing Santander
12 September 2003	12 October 2003	FW	(England) Neil Wood	(England) Peterborough United
19 September 2003	18 October 2003	GK	(England) Ben Williams	(England) Altrincham
24 October 2003	24 November 2003	FW	(England) Daniel Nardiello	(Wales) Swansea City
24 October 2003	29 December 2003	DF	(England) Alan Tate	(Wales) Swansea City
24 November 2003	25 December 2003	FW	(England) Danny Byrne	(England) Hartlepool United
2 January 2004	26 April 2004	GK	(France) Fabien Barthez	(France) Marseille
12 January 2004	16 December 2006	FW	(China) Dong Fangzhuo	(Belgium) Royal Antwerp
27 January 2004	30 June 2004	FW	(England) Daniel Nardiello	(England) Barnsley
29 January 2004	30 April 2004	FW	(England) Neil Wood	(England) Burnley
29 January 2004	29 February 2004	DF	(Republic of Ireland) Paul Tierney	(England) Colchester United
30 January 2004	23 May 2004	DF	(England) Phil Bardsley	(Belgium) Royal Antwerp
30 January 2004	23 May 2004	FW	(England) Eddie Johnson	(Belgium) Royal Antwerp
19 March 2004	9 May 2004	GK	(England) Ben Williams	(England) Crewe Alexandra
23 March 2004	30 June 2004	DF	(England) Lee Lawrence	(England) Shrewsbury Town
24 March 2004	30 June 2004	FW	(Denmark) Mads Timm	(Norway) Viking
