= Chris Eagles =

English footballer (born 1985)

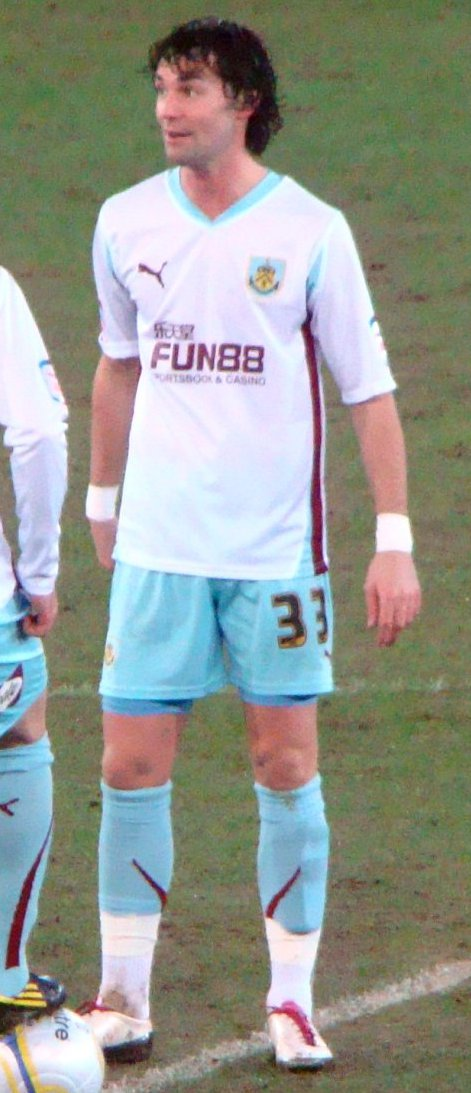
- Eagles with Burnley in 2011

Personal information
- Full name: Christopher Mark Eagles
- Date of birth: 19 November 1985 (age 40)
- Place of birth: Hemel Hempstead, England
- Height: 6 ft 0 in (1.83 m)
- Positions: Winger; attacking midfielder

Youth career
- 1998–2000: Watford
- 2000–2003: Manchester United

Senior career*
| Years | Team | Apps | (Gls) |
| 2003–2008 | Manchester United | 6 | (1) |
| 2005 | → Watford (loan) | 13 | (1) |
| 2005 | → Sheffield Wednesday (loan) | 25 | (3) |
| 2006 | → Watford (loan) | 17 | (3) |
| 2006 | → NEC Nijmegen (loan) | 15 | (1) |
| 2008–2011 | Burnley | 120 | (20) |
| 2011–2014 | Bolton Wanderers | 93 | (17) |
| 2014–2015 | Blackpool | 7 | (1) |
| 2015 | Charlton Athletic | 15 | (2) |
| 2015–2016 | Bury | 4 | (0) |
| 2016–2017 | Accrington Stanley | 6 | (0) |
| 2017 | Port Vale | 20 | (4) |
| 2017–2018 | Ross County | 8 | (0) |
| 2019–2020 | Oldham Athletic | 15 | (0) |
| Total | | 364 | (53) |
- * Club domestic league appearances and goals

Christopher Mark Eagles (born 19 November 1985) is an English former professional footballer who played as a winger.

After coming through the youth system at Watford, he began his professional career with Manchester United. He was unable to break into the first-team regularly. He played 17 times for United, including in the 2004 and 2007 FA Community Shield matches. He had two loan spells back at Watford, as well as with Sheffield Wednesday and Dutch club NEC Nijmegen, before a permanent move to Burnley for a £1.2 million fee in July 2008. He spent three seasons with the club, helping them to win promotion out of the Championship in 2009. He was sold to Bolton Wanderers in July 2011, where he stayed for another three seasons. He went on to have brief spells with Blackpool, Charlton Athletic, Bury, Accrington Stanley, Port Vale and Ross County. He joined Oldham Athletic in July 2019 after spending more than a year away from the game before leaving his contract early in January 2020.

== Career ==
Eagles was born in Hemel Hempstead, Hertfordshire, and was a season ticket holder at Tottenham Hotspur, whom he went to see with his family. Originally coming through the youth system at Watford, Eagles left when he was 14 to join the Manchester United academy. The compensation owed to Watford for this move would later form part of the package, which took Danny Webber in the opposite direction.

=== Manchester United ===
Eagles made his first-team debut for Manchester United on 28 October 2003 as a second-half substitute for Kieran Richardson in an extra time win away to Leeds United in the League Cup. He played once more that season, this time as a substitute for Cristiano Ronaldo as United lost 2–0 away to West Bromwich Albion in the fourth round of the League Cup. His performances saw him nominated for the new League Cup talent award, awarded to the young player judged to have made the best first-team breakthrough in the competition. He played in the 2004 FA Community Shield, coming on as a 74th-minute substitute in a 3–1 defeat by Arsenal at the Millennium Stadium.

Eagles was loaned out to Watford on 21 January 2005. He scored his first goal in senior football in a 2–0 win over Gillingham at Vicarage Road on 5 February. He made 13 Championship appearances for the "Hornets", and manager Ray Lewington said that: "he is an exciting player and has done very well". He was also loaned to Sheffield Wednesday for the first half of the 2005–06 season. Manager Paul Sturrock stated that: "Sir Alex said to me that he wants this player to play in front of big crowds and see how he handles it". He scored his first goal for the "Owls" in a 1–0 victory over Leeds United at Hillsborough on 13 September. He ended his loan spell at Wednesday with three goals in 25 appearances. On 6 January 2006, Eagles returned on loan to Aidy Boothroyd's Watford. He scored the only goal of the match against Stoke City in the first league appearance of his second loan spell at Watford. He scored the winning goal in the 1–0 away win at Brighton & Hove Albion on 18 February from 50 yards (46 m) (almost the halfway line), which won him the club's goal of the season award. Watford reached the 2006 Championship play-off final, and Eagles was an unused substitute as they secured promotion to the Premier League with a 3–0 win over Leeds United.

On 31 August 2006, Eagles agreed to spend four months on loan at Dutch Eredivisie side NEC Nijmegen to gain more experience. He decided to take the option of returning to Old Trafford on 21 December after struggling to get many games at the Stadion de Goffert. On 13 March, Eagles featured in the second half for United in the UEFA Celebration Match exhibition game at Old Trafford against Marcello Lippi's Europe XI. On 28 April, Eagles scored his first senior goal for United in a 4–2 Premier League win over Everton; after coming on as a second-half substitute, he scored a 93rd-minute goal to put the result beyond doubt as United went five points clear in their race for the Premier League title. He was an unused substitute in the 2007 FA Community Shield, as United beat Chelsea on penalties following a 1–1 draw.

=== Burnley ===
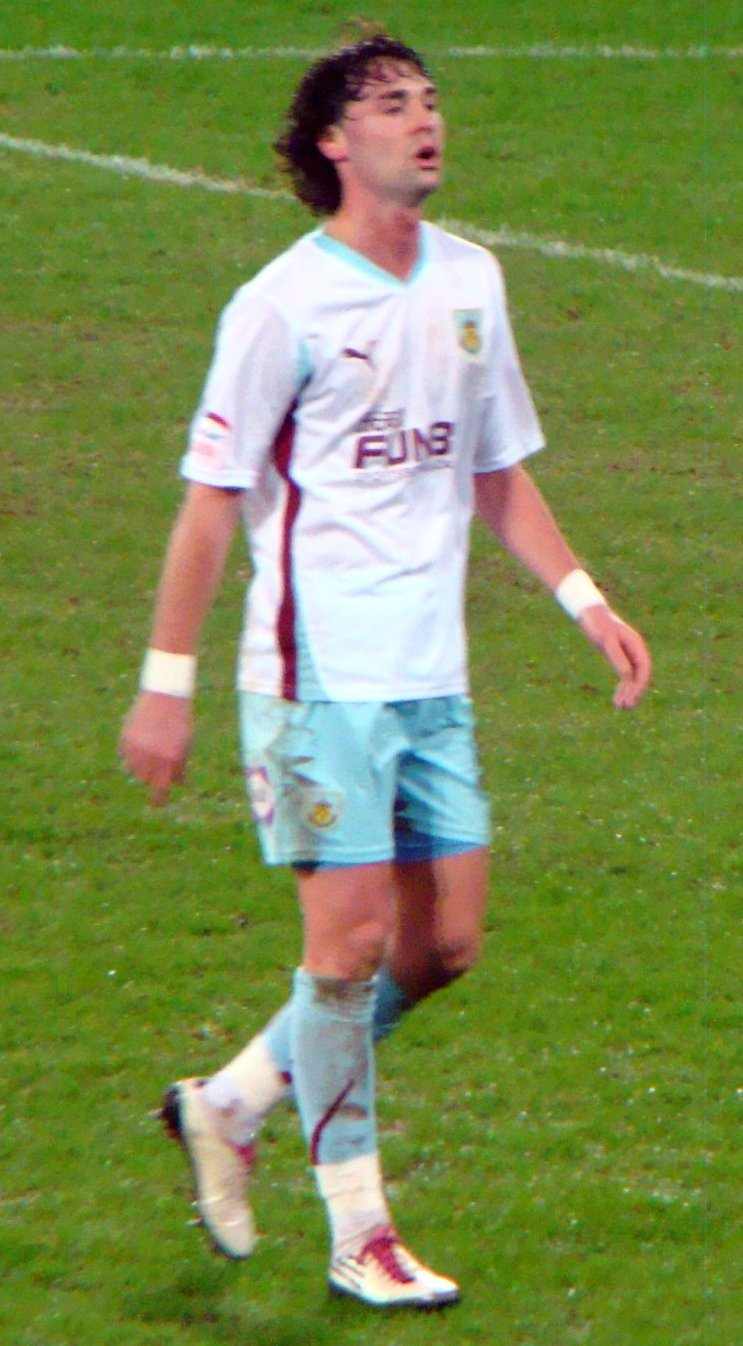
Eagles playing for Burnley in 2011

In July 2008, Eagles signed for Burnley on a three-year contract for an undisclosed fee. The London Evening Standard reported that the fee was £1.2 million, of which £200,000 would go to Watford as part of a sell-on clause. Manager Owen Coyle said: "He can play as a striker, or behind the striker or wide or as a central midfielder. He gives you a host of variations, but outwith that he's a talented footballer and that's what we want – young exciting talents to complement the quality we already have." Eagles made his league debut for Burnley on 9 August in a 4–1 loss to Sheffield Wednesday. On 27 September, he scored his first goal for Burnley in a 3–1 victory over rivals Preston North End. He was nominated for the Championship Player of the Month award for November, losing out to Chris Iwelumo. He ended the 2008–09 season with eight goals in 57 league and cup appearances, and came on as a 69th-minute substitute for Robbie Blake as Burnley beat Sheffield United 1–0 in the Championship play-off final at Wembley Stadium.

He scored two goals in 34 Premier League games in the 2009–10 campaign as Burnley were relegated in 18th-place. In July 2010, the "Clarets" accepted a bid from Scottish champions Rangers to buy Eagles, but the player was unable to agree terms with the Scottish club and remained in England. He agreed a new two-year contract with Burnley the following month. In October 2010, manager Brian Laws said that Eagles was "unplayable" and in "absolutely magnificent form" after scoring five goals in the space of four games. Eagles went on to score 15 goals in 48 appearances for Burnley in the 2010–11 season, and newly appointed manager Eddie Howe was reported to have planned to build his team around Eagles.

=== Bolton Wanderers ===
In July 2011, Eagles and his Burnley teammate Tyrone Mears joined Bolton Wanderers on a three-year contract for a joint fee in the region of £3 million, linking up with their ex-manager Owen Coyle for the second time in their careers. He made his debut in a 4–0 away win at Queens Park Rangers on 13 August, where he created an assist for the second goal put in his own net by Danny Gabbidon. On 20 September, he scored his first goal for the "Trotters", from 25 yards (23 m), in the League Cup third round 2–0 away win against Aston Villa. He also scored a brace in a 5–0 win over Stoke City at the Reebok Stadium on 6 November. He found himself out of the starting line-up for a short time due to Tuncay Şanlı being in form, but he came back to the starting line-up on 21 April, where he scored in a 1–1 draw at home to Swansea City. At the end of the season, Bolton were relegated to the Championship.

The fans named Eagles Player of the Month for August, September and October of the new season. He finished the 2012–13 season as Bolton's top goalscorer with twelve goals, and also created the most, with twelve assists. His form in April earned him a nomination for the Championship Player of the Month award.

He played just 18 games in the 2013–14 season and was released by the club in May 2014. Shortly after his release from Bolton, he explained that he was disappointed at aspects of his departure. Still, he admired the club's supporters and the town. In July 2014, Eagles was awarded an honorary degree by the University of Bolton for his services to sport. He later blamed manager Dougie Freedman for his exit, saying "I didn't like him and I didn't like the way he managed. He showed me no respect".

=== Later career ===
On 18 November 2014, Eagles joined Blackpool on a short-term contract until January 2015. He played seven games for the "Tangerines", but left Bloomfield Road at the expiry of his contract despite both he and manager Lee Clark reportedly being keen to extend his stay at the club. Eagles signed for Charlton Athletic on 19 February 2015 on a free transfer until the end of the 2014–15 season. He scored on his Charlton debut, as the "Addicks" won 3–0 away at Wigan Athletic; manager Guy Luzon said that "he played well for his first time". He left The Valley at the expiry of his contract in May 2015.

Eagles had trials with Preston North End, Wigan Athletic, and Coventry City before joining League One club Bury in October 2015 on a contract until the end of the 2015–16 season. However, four months later he was sent to train with Ryan Kidd and the youth team by manager David Flitcroft, who deemed him not fit enough to train with the first-team. He was released in the summer and signed with John Coleman's League Two side Accrington Stanley in August 2016. The following month he agreed to stay at the Crown Ground until January after settling in well at the club.

He joined League One side Port Vale on a short-term contract after impressing manager Michael Brown during a trial game in January 2017. After initially being used out wide, he was moved to a number 10 role and scored in consecutive games against Southend United and Swindon Town to pick up important points for Vale's relegation battle. He won a place on the EFL Team of the Week after picking up an assist and a goal in a 2–0 win over AFC Wimbledon at Vale Park on 1 April. He also scored the only goal of the penultimate game of the season against Walsall on 25 April to take the "Valiants" ultimately unsuccessful battle against relegation to the last day of the 2016–17 season; the strike won him the club's Goal of the Season award. He left the club at the end of the season, but returned to train at Vale Park in November 2017 after new manager Neil Aspin offered him a contract, which Eagles rejected.

On 23 November 2017, Eagles signed for Scottish Premiership club Ross County until the end of the 2017–18 season, reuniting with former manager Owen Coyle at the Scottish Premiership club. Eagles left Ross County by mutual consent on 4 April, a month after Coyle had resigned as manager.

After spending 15 months as a free agent, Eagles returned to League Two on 27 July 2019 after signing a one-year deal with Oldham Athletic, with the option of a further year. However, he departed Boundary Park on 6 January 2020 after agreeing to a mutual termination of his contract.

On 14 November 2021, Eagles played in a charity match as part of a team of Bolton Wanderers Legends against the current Bolton first-team, with the match helping to raise money for the mother of Bolton player Gethin Jones, who had been diagnosed with Motor neuron disease. The Bolton first team won 7–4, with Eagles scoring twice for the Legends team.

== Style of play ==
Eagles was a winger, though he could also play as an attacking midfielder. Writing for The Guardian in December 2008, Steve Claridge reported that Eagles "is a natural footballer who makes the difficult things look easy", boasting natural ability and composure, as well as good distribution skills; he did however, criticize his tactical discipline and defensive work rate. Former Bury teammate Tom Pope said that: his "technique was frighteningly good – that was his ability on the ball, dribbling and his awareness of players around him".

== Personal life ==
Eagles joined Alcoholics Anonymous in September 2021 after being found by police while drunk in charge of a vehicle outside the home of ex-girlfriend Jennifer Metcalfe; he was banned from driving for three months and fined £1,250. He had recently split from his fiancée, Danielle Mitchinson, with whom he had two children during an eight-year relationship.

== Career statistics ==
Appearances and goals by club, season and competition
| Club | Season | League | | | National cup (Note: Includes FA Cup, Scottish Cup, KNVB Cup) | | League cup (Note: Includes Football League Cup, Scottish League Cup) | | Europe | | Other | | Total | |
| Club | Season | Division | Apps | Goals | Apps | Goals | Apps | Goals | Apps | Goals | Apps | Goals | Apps | Goals |
|---|---|---|---|---|---|---|---|---|---|---|---|---|---|---|
| Manchester United | 2003–04 | Premier League | 0 | 0 | 0 | 0 | 2 | 0 | 0 | 0 | 0 | 0 | 2 | 0 |
| Manchester United | 2004–05 | Premier League | 0 | 0 | 1 | 0 | 3 | 0 | 2 (Note: Appearances in UEFA Champions League) | 0 | 1 (Note: Appearance in FA Community Shield) | 0 | 7 | 0 |
| Manchester United | 2005–06 | Premier League | 0 | 0 | 0 | 0 | 0 | 0 | 0 | 0 | — | | 0 | 0 |
| Manchester United | 2006–07 | Premier League | 2 | 1 | 0 | 0 | 0 | 0 | 0 | 0 | — | | 2 | 1 |
| Manchester United | 2007–08 | Premier League | 4 | 0 | 0 | 0 | 1 | 0 | 1 | 0 | 0 | 0 | 6 | 0 |
| Manchester United | Total | | 6 | 1 | 1 | 0 | 6 | 0 | 3 | 0 | 1 | 0 | 17 | 1 |
| Watford (loan) | 2004–05 | Championship | 13 | 1 | — | | — | | — | | — | | 13 | 1 |
| Sheffield Wednesday (loan) | 2005–06 | Championship | 25 | 3 | 0 | 0 | 0 | 0 | — | | — | | 25 | 3 |
| Watford (loan) | 2005–06 | Championship | 17 | 3 | 1 | 0 | — | | — | | 1 (Note: Appearances in EFL Championship play-offs) | 0 | 19 | 3 |
| NEC Nijmegen (loan) | 2006–07 | Eredivisie | 15 | 1 | 2 | 1 | — | | — | | — | | 17 | 2 |
| Burnley | 2008–09 | Championship | 43 | 7 | 4 | 0 | 7 | 0 | — | | 3 | 0 | 57 | 7 |
| Burnley | 2009–10 | Premier League | 34 | 2 | 2 | 0 | 2 | 1 | — | | — | | 38 | 3 |
| Burnley | 2010–11 | Championship | 43 | 11 | 3 | 3 | 2 | 1 | — | | — | | 48 | 15 |
| Burnley | Total | | 120 | 20 | 9 | 3 | 11 | 2 | — | | 3 | 0 | 143 | 25 |
| Bolton Wanderers | 2011–12 | Premier League | 34 | 4 | 4 | 1 | 3 | 1 | — | | — | | 41 | 6 |
| Bolton Wanderers | 2012–13 | Championship | 43 | 12 | 3 | 0 | 1 | 0 | — | | — | | 47 | 12 |
| Bolton Wanderers | 2013–14 | Championship | 16 | 1 | 2 | 0 | 0 | 0 | — | | — | | 18 | 1 |
| Bolton Wanderers | Total | | 93 | 17 | 9 | 1 | 4 | 1 | — | | — | | 106 | 19 |
| Blackpool | 2014–15 | Championship | 7 | 1 | 0 | 0 | — | | — | | — | | 7 | 1 |
| Charlton Athletic | 2014–15 | Championship | 15 | 2 | — | | — | | — | | — | | 15 | 2 |
| Bury | 2015–16 | League One | 4 | 0 | 1 | 0 | — | | — | | — | | 5 | 0 |
| Accrington Stanley | 2016–17 | EFL League Two | 6 | 0 | 0 | 0 | 2 | 0 | — | | 2 (Note: Appearances in EFL Trophy) | 0 | 10 | 0 |
| Port Vale | 2016–17 | EFL League One | 20 | 4 | — | | — | | — | | — | | 20 | 4 |
| Ross County | 2017–18 | Scottish Premiership | 8 | 0 | 1 | 0 | — | | — | | — | | 9 | 0 |
| Oldham Athletic | 2019–20 | EFL League Two | 15 | 0 | 1 | 0 | 0 | 0 | — | | 2 | 0 | 17 | 0 |
| Career total | | | 364 | 53 | 25 | 5 | 23 | 3 | 3 | 0 | 9 | 0 | 424 | 61 |

== Honours ==
Manchester United

- FA Community Shield: 2007

Watford

- Football League Championship play-offs: 2006

Burnley

- Football League Championship play-offs: 2009
