= UEFA Celebration Match =

Manchester United	Europe XI
(England)	(Europe)
4	3
- Date: 13 March 2007
- Venue: Old Trafford, Manchester
- Referee: Markus Merk (Germany)
- Attendance: 74,343

The UEFA Celebration Match was a football match played at Old Trafford, Manchester, on 13 March 2007 as a celebration of both the 50th anniversary of the signing of the Treaty of Rome, which laid the foundations for the European Union, and the first participation of Manchester United F.C. in UEFA competitions. Manchester United won the match 4–3 against a Europe XI managed by Italian World Cup-winning manager Marcello Lippi. All the hosts' goals came before half-time (two from Wayne Rooney,one from Wes Brown and one from Cristiano Ronaldo), Florent Malouda scored for the Europe XI midway through the first half and El Hadji Diouf scored twice in the second.

The match was televised live on BBC Three in the United Kingdom and also streamed live via the BBC Online website. Proceeds from the match went to Manchester United's charity, the Manchester United Foundation; in total, £1.25 million was raised. The match was officiated by German referee Markus Merk, whose assistants came from three other European countries.

== Background ==
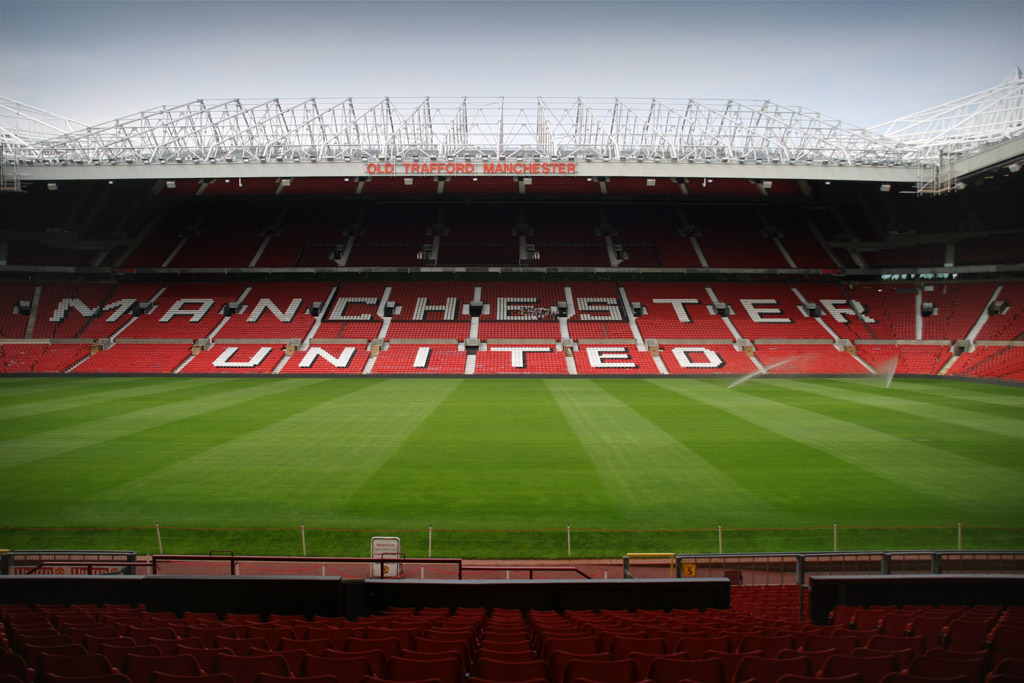
The match was played at Manchester United's home ground, Old Trafford.

The match was first announced by UEFA at a press conference immediately following the derby match between Manchester United and Manchester City on 9 December 2006. The European Union proposed the idea to UEFA as a way of recognising the 50th anniversary of the Treaty of Rome, which was signed on 25 March 1957 and laid the foundations for a united Europe and the European Union itself. A football match was chosen as the showpiece event as the way football brings people of all different nationalities together was viewed as a symbolic representation of how Europe was brought together politically. José Manuel Barroso, the president of the European Commission, said, "The best of European football will be on show in Manchester next March to mark the 50th anniversary of the creation of the European Union. There is no better way to showcase the European Union at 50 than through Europe's favourite sport that unites Europeans in a unique way, through a passion we all share and a language we all speak."

Manchester United became involved in the project as they were also celebrating the 50th anniversary of their involvement in UEFA competitions; in 1956–57, they became England's first representatives in the European Cup under the management of Matt Busby, who guided his team to their first European title in 1968. A Europe XI was selected as their opposition for the match, featuring players of various nationalities from some of Europe's biggest clubs. This team would be managed by Italian coach Marcello Lippi, with UEFA Technical Director Andy Roxburgh as his assistant. Lippi said, "I accepted the invitation immediately. I'm delighted by the prospect of such a game and I am already looking forward to taking on my great friend [Manchester United manager] Sir Alex Ferguson." Former Manchester United midfielder David Beckham was the first player to be invited to play in the match, and he later said of his involvement, "I'm happy I'm going to play on 13 March. It will be something special to go back to Old Trafford, and I'm really looking forward to it."

== Pre-match ==
=== Ticketing ===
Although the capacity of Old Trafford at the time was over 76,000, this was substantially reduced for the game due to the installation of two giant screens that would show a pre-match video featuring clips of Manchester United's involvement in European matches over the previous 50 years. By the weekend before the game, 70,000 tickets had been sold at £17 for adults, half-price for over-65s and £5 for under-16s. The capacity for the match was reportedly capped at 72,000; however, the attendance recorded was in excess of 74,000. Proceeds from ticket sales went towards the Manchester United Foundation, a group working towards improving the lives of young people in the local community using football.

=== Officials ===
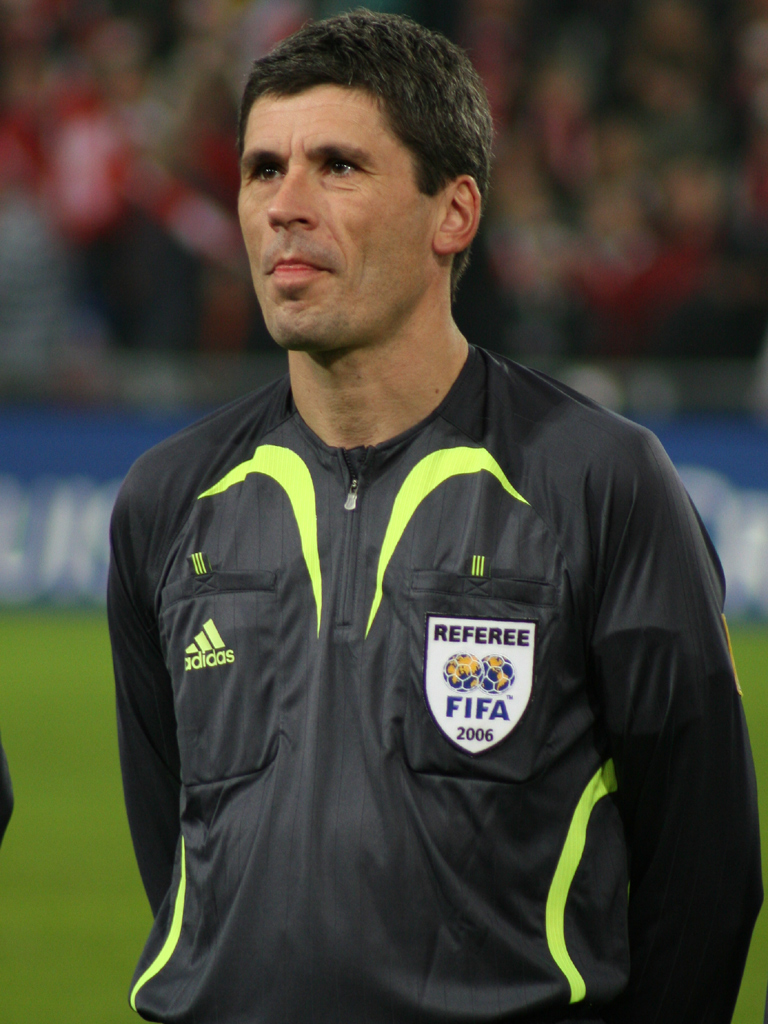
German referee Markus Merk was appointed to officiate the match.

Reflecting the various nations of Europe, the officials for the match came from four different countries. The referee, Markus Merk from Germany, had previously taken charge of the 2003 UEFA Champions League Final – also at Old Trafford – as well as the 1997 UEFA Cup Winners' Cup Final, and was the German representative at the 2002 and 2006 World Cups, and at the 2000 and 2004 European Championships, refereeing the final in 2004. Merk's assistants were Italian Alessandro Griselli and Belgian Mark Simons, while the fourth official was Howard Webb of England.

=== Team selection ===
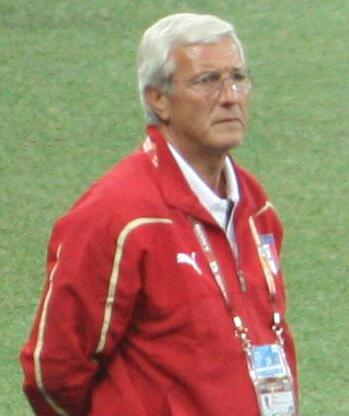
UEFA selected the Italy national team coach Marcello Lippi to be the manager of the Europe XI.

The first player to be added to the Europe XI squad was former Manchester United midfielder David Beckham, then of Real Madrid. After being invited in December 2006, he confirmed his attendance in February 2007. He was followed soon after by Liverpool players Steven Gerrard and Jamie Carragher. The next additions were Lyon trio Grégory Coupet, Eric Abidal and Juninho Pernambucano, and then the Barcelona quartet of Carles Puyol, Lilian Thuram, Gianluca Zambrotta and Ronaldinho. In addition to allowing his players to play in the match, Barcelona manager Frank Rijkaard joined Marcello Lippi on the Europe XI coaching staff.

The weekend before the game saw the final confirmation of most of the squad, including Henrik Larsson, whose 10-week loan at Manchester United came to an end on 12 March. Also confirming their availability on 10 March were Internazionale trio Zlatan Ibrahimović, Marco Materazzi and Fabio Grosso, as well as a further Lyon player, Florent Malouda, and Bayern Munich goalkeeper Oliver Kahn. However, Beckham was ruled out of the game after suffering a sprained knee ligament. A final tranche of players was added on 11 March, including Milan quartet Paolo Maldini, Gennaro Gattuso, Andrea Pirlo and Ronaldo, Roma midfielder Mancini, Valencia defender Miguel and Real Madrid goalkeeper Iker Casillas.

Lippi confirmed his squad for the match at a press conference at the headquarters of the European Commission in Brussels on 12 March, at which UEFA President Michel Platini, European Commission President José Manuel Barroso and Manchester United director Bobby Charlton were also present. At the press conference, Lippi revealed that Zinedine Zidane had been approached to come out of retirement to play in the game, but the French midfielder had declined; Zidane's reasons were not made public, but it is believed that he did not want to play on the same team as Materazzi, whom he had infamously headbutted in the 2006 FIFA World Cup Final.

On the day of the game, however, there were a number of withdrawals, most notably Ronaldinho, who aggravated an existing injury in Barcelona's game against Real Madrid the previous weekend. Other drop-outs were Oliver Kahn, Iker Casillas, Paolo Maldini, Lilian Thuram, Carles Puyol, Fabio Grosso, Miguel, Juninho and Ronaldo. The last-minute nature of these withdrawals led to further call-ups, predominantly teammates of the remaining squad members and from other English clubs; these final players were Santiago Cañizares, Roberto Ayala (both Valencia), Iván Campo, Stelios Giannakopoulos, El Hadji Diouf (all Bolton Wanderers), Dejan Stefanović (Portsmouth), Philippe Christanval (Fulham), Kim Källström (Lyon), Boudewijn Zenden and Robbie Fowler (both Liverpool).

Manchester United had a number of players missing due to injury. Edwin van der Sar strained his calf in the warm-up before United's FA Cup match against Middlesbrough on 10 March, and Rio Ferdinand and Nemanja Vidić picked up knocks in the same game. Other long-term injury concerns included Mikaël Silvestre (dislocated shoulder), Darren Fletcher (ankle), Louis Saha (hamstring) and Ole Gunnar Solskjær (knee). However, Alan Smith was available as he made his recovery from a broken leg and dislocated ankle he suffered in February 2006. There were also places in the team for youngsters Kieran Richardson, Chris Eagles and Tom Heaton, while Dong Fangzhuo – recently returned from a loan spell at Royal Antwerp after receiving a UK work permit – was added to the first-team squad to bolster a depleted strike force. Despite Alex Ferguson's earlier assertions that the Manchester United team would be entirely composed of current players, they had a guest player of their own: Andy Cole – then of Portsmouth – made a return to Old Trafford in the number 9 shirt, the squad number worn at the time by Saha, that he had worn for the majority of his career there.

== Match ==
=== Summary ===
==== First half ====
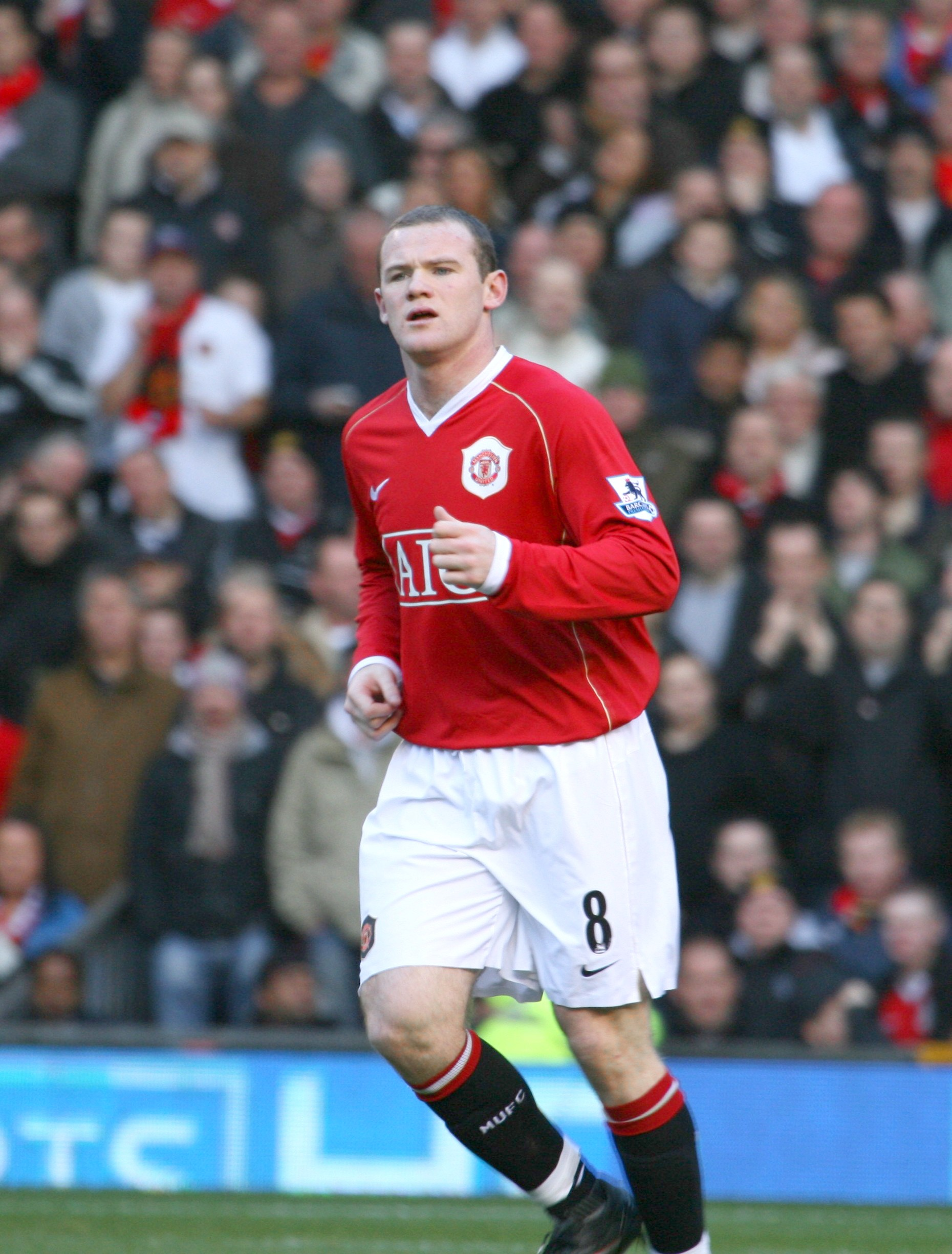
Wayne Rooney scored two goals in the first half for Manchester United.

Manchester United opened the scoring in the sixth minute of the match, when Paul Scholes played a through-ball to Wayne Rooney, who deceived the onrushing Santiago Cañizares by stepping over the ball before tapping it past the Spanish goalkeeper into the net. Three minutes later, Cristiano Ronaldo played a short corner to Ryan Giggs, who evaded challenges from two Europe XI players before playing the ball across the goal area, from where Wes Brown poked it home. After a couple more chances for the home side, the Europe XI got themselves back into the game midway through the first half, via Florent Malouda's low, long-range strike, which passed just out of reach of Tomasz Kuszczak's outstretched hand.

Cristiano Ronaldo restored United's two-goal lead in the 35th minute, after Park Ji-sung had been fouled 30 yards from goal; anticipating that Ronaldo would shoot for the open side of the goal, Cañizares took a step to his right as Ronaldo struck the ball, only to see it fly over the wall and into the top corner on the opposite side. The Europe XI had a chance to reduce the deficit again from the penalty spot a minute later, when Brown fouled Zlatan Ibrahimović inside the penalty area; the Swede wrestled the ball from his compatriot Henrik Larsson to take the penalty himself, denying Larsson the chance to score against the team he had left only the day before, but Ibrahimović's kick hit the crossbar. Rooney added a fourth goal for Manchester United (his second) two minutes before the half-time break; Ronaldo picked up the ball just inside his own half before driving forward and passing to Park on the right wing. The Korean crossed the ball into the penalty area, where Rooney allowed it to pass across his body before side-footing home with his left foot.

==== Second half ====
Not wanting to risk their best players getting injured, Manchester United made five substitutions at half-time, bringing off Kuszczak, Ronaldo, Giggs, Rooney and captain Gary Neville to be replaced by debutant Tom Heaton, John O'Shea, Chris Eagles, Michael Carrick and Andy Cole, who was making a one-off guest appearance. The Europe XI also made extensive changes, replacing nine of their starting line-up, with only Larsson and full-back Gianluca Zambrotta remaining on the field. Among those to come on was Bolton striker El Hadji Diouf, who scored within seven minutes of the restart. From a corner kick, the Senegalese forward exchanged passes with two of his teammates before crossing to the far post, where Dejan Stefanović headed the ball back across goal for Diouf himself to head past Heaton. Diouf then scored a late consolation goal from a penalty kick, after Gabriel Heinze had handled the ball in the penalty area; with Heaton having committed himself to diving to his right, Diouf chipped the ball on the bounce into the centre of the goal. That was the last goal to be scored and the game finished 4–3 to Manchester United.

=== Details ===
13 March 2007
20:00 GMT

Manchester United (England)	4–3	Europe XI
Rooney 6', 43'; Brown 9'; Ronaldo 35'	Report	Malouda 23'; Diouf 52', 88' (pen.)

Old Trafford, Manchester
Attendance: 74,343
Referee: Markus Merk (Germany)

Manchester United	Europe XI

GK	29	(Poland) Tomasz Kuszczak	(substituted off) 45'
RB	2	(England) Gary Neville (c)	(substituted off) 45'
CB	6	(England) Wes Brown
CB	4	(Argentina) Gabriel Heinze
LB	23	(England) Kieran Richardson
RM	7	(Portugal) Cristiano Ronaldo	(substituted off) 45'
CM	18	(England) Paul Scholes
CM	11	(Wales) Ryan Giggs	(substituted off) 45'
LM	13	(South Korea) Park Ji-sung
CF	14	(England) Alan Smith	(substituted off) 72'
CF	8	(England) Wayne Rooney	(substituted off) 45'
Substitutes:
GK	38	(England) Tom Heaton	(substituted on) 45'
DF	22	(Republic of Ireland) John O'Shea	(substituted on) 45'
MF	16	(England) Michael Carrick	(substituted on) 45'
MF	33	(England) Chris Eagles	(substituted on) 45'
FW	9	(England) Andy Cole (guest)	(substituted on) 45'
FW	21	(China) Dong Fangzhuo	(substituted on) 72'
Manager:
(Scotland) Alex Ferguson

GK	1	(Spain) Santiago Cañizares (Valencia)	(substituted off) 45'
RB	11	(Italy) Gianluca Zambrotta (Barcelona)	(substituted off) 64'
CB	4	(Argentina) Roberto Ayala (Valencia)	(substituted off) 45'
CB	23	(Italy) Marco Materazzi (Internazionale)	(substituted off) 45'
LB	20	(France) Eric Abidal (Lyon)	(substituted off) 45'
RM	30	(Brazil) Mancini (Roma)	(substituted off) 45'
CM	21	(Italy) Andrea Pirlo (Milan)	(substituted off) 45'
CM	18	(Italy) Gennaro Gattuso (Milan)	(substituted off) 45'
LM	14	(France) Florent Malouda (Lyon)	(substituted off) 45'
CF	10	(Sweden) Zlatan Ibrahimović (Internazionale)	(substituted off) 45'
CF	17	(Sweden) Henrik Larsson (c) (Helsingborg)	(substituted off) 64'
Substitutes:
GK	12	(France) Grégory Coupet (Lyon)	(substituted on) 45'
DF	2	(Spain) Iván Campo (Bolton Wanderers)	(substituted on) 64'
DF	3	(Serbia) Dejan Stefanović (Portsmouth)	(substituted on) 45'
DF	5	(France) Philippe Christanval (Fulham)	(substituted on) 45'
DF	15	(England) Jamie Carragher (Liverpool)	(substituted on) 45'
MF	6	(Sweden) Kim Källström (Lyon)	(substituted on) 45'
MF	8	(England) Steven Gerrard (Liverpool)	(substituted on) 45'
MF	16	(Greece) Stelios Giannakopoulos (Bolton Wanderers)	(substituted on) 45'
MF	32	(Netherlands) Boudewijn Zenden (Liverpool)	(substituted on) 45'
FW	9	(England) Robbie Fowler (Liverpool)	(substituted on) 64'
FW	19	(Senegal) El Hadji Diouf (Bolton Wanderers)	(substituted on) 45'
Manager:
(Italy) Marcello Lippi

Assistant referees:
Alessandro Griselli (Italy)
Mark Simons (Belgium)
Fourth official:
Howard Webb (England)

== Post-match ==
After the game, Alex Ferguson paid tribute to the spectacle of the event, saying, "It was fantastic. All the players were relaxed and it's amazing when you play without pressure, they can enjoy themselves so much. For everyone who attended the game, it was a really good night. It was good that there were so many young people here. Ticket prices were good for young people and it was good to see some really good football also." Marcello Lippi was equally effusive about the performances on show: "It was meant to be a celebration and it was. What I saw on the pitch was a good performance and a good show for the fans. I thank all those players that came because some came at the last minute and were quite keen to play in this celebration match."

The dignitaries present at Old Trafford paid tribute to the message that the game sent out about unity and the importance of a united Europe. UEFA president Michel Platini said, "Football brings people together. In a continent so proud of its cultural diversity, football offers a common language. It helps to integrate different communities. At its best, our sport conveys some of Europe's basic values: the rule of law, respect for others, freedom of expression, teamwork and solidarity. I feel very proud that UEFA has been able to organise this special match." Meanwhile, Bobby Charlton commented, "The history of Manchester United is tied up with that of Europe. Some of the club's greatest moments have been played out on a European stage." He also stated that he was pleased to welcome "so many stars and friends to Old Trafford to celebrate these two significant anniversaries".

In total, the match raised £1.25 million for the Manchester United Foundation.

== Broadcasting ==
The match was broadcast live on national television stations in 17 European Union countries, as well as several other non-EU European nations, with host broadcasting provided by the British Broadcasting Corporation (BBC). In the UK, the match was shown on BBC Three and on the BBC Online website. The BBC broadcast was hosted by Gabby Logan, with studio pundits Alan Hansen and Mark Hughes, and commentary from Guy Mowbray and Mark Lawrenson.

Nation	Broadcaster
Belgium	RTBF, VRT
Bulgaria	BNT
Cyprus	CBC, Lumiere TV
Czech Republic	Sport 1 TV
France	France 4
Germany	ARD, ZDF
Greece	ERT
Hungary	Sport 1 TV
Ireland	RTÉ Two
Italy	RAI
Lithuania	LT
Poland	TVP
Portugal	RTP
Romania	TV Sport, Sport 1 TV
Slovakia	Sport 1 TV
Spain	TVE

== See also ==
- Football for Hope
