= Alan Smith (footballer, born 1980) =

English footballer (born 1980)

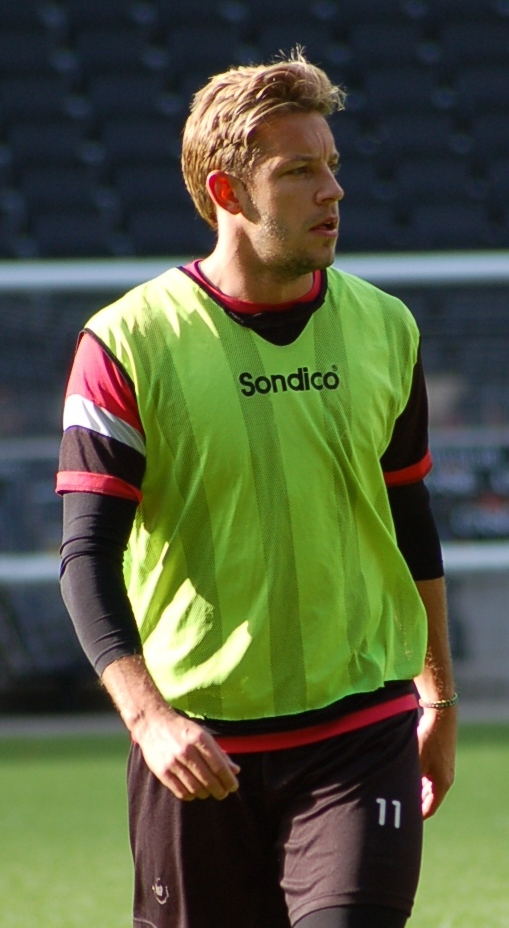
- Smith training for Milton Keynes Dons in 2013

Personal information
- Full name: Alan Smith
- Date of birth: 28 October 1980 (age 46)
- Place of birth: Rothwell, England
- Height: 5 ft 10 in (1.78 m)
- Positions: Midfielder; striker

Youth career
- 1996–1998: Leeds United

Senior career*
Years	Team	Apps	(Gls)
1998–2004	Leeds United	172	(38)
2004–2007	Manchester United	61	(7)
2007–2012	Newcastle United	84	(0)
2012	→ Milton Keynes Dons (loan)	16	(1)
2012–2014	Milton Keynes Dons	51	(1)
2014–2018	Notts County	87	(0)
Total		471	(47)

International career
1999–2001	England U21	10	(3)
2007	England B	1	(1)
2001–2007	England	19	(1)

Managerial career
- 2017: Notts County (caretaker)
- * Club domestic league appearances and goals as of 14:57, 19 March 2018 (UTC)

Alan Smith (born 28 October 1980) is an English former professional footballer. Smith first came to prominence as both a striker and a right winger, but later became a holding midfielder.

Smith began his career with hometown club Leeds United and became a mainstay in their Premier League teams between 1998 and 2004. Initially playing as a striker during his Elland Road days he scored 38 goals in 172 games. Following the club's relegation in 2004, he joined rivals Manchester United, but after moving to the club he broke his leg and dislocated his ankle in a match against Liverpool, whereupon manager Sir Alex Ferguson converted him to a holding midfielder, a role in which he continued after his transfer to Newcastle United. He later moved to Milton Keynes Dons for several seasons before signing for Notts County. He had a short spell as caretaker manager of County in 2017, but later reverted to the role of player-coach after the appointment of Kevin Nolan as manager.

He has also represented the England national team, winning 19 caps. Smith was known for his aggressive mentality on the pitch and his high-pressing style of football and earned a reputation as a hard-tackling player and is noted for his high work rate.

== Early life ==
Smith was born and brought up in Rothwell, West Yorkshire, where he attended Rodillian School. In 1995, he attended the Football Association School of Excellence along with fifteen other students at Lilleshall Hall in Shropshire, where he was one of the subjects of a 1999 ITV documentary The World At Their Feet, which followed the futures of the academy's 1995 intake. During his time at Lilleshall, Smith attended Idsall School in Shifnal.

== Club career ==
=== Leeds United ===
Smith started his career with Leeds and scored in his first-team debut against Liverpool, aged 18. He went on to become an undisputed first-choice, as the side consolidated on domestic and European fronts, reaching the semi-finals of the 2000–01 Champions League. Smith was part of an offensive line that included Michael Bridges and Australian Mark Viduka.

His senior FA Premier League debut was as a substitute for Leeds United against Liverpool at Anfield, where he displayed his natural scoring ability by scoring with his first shot of the game, three minutes after coming off the bench. That goal helped propel him into the 1998–99 English football season, as he was one-half of manager David O'Leary's first-choice striker pairing, along with Jimmy Floyd Hasselbaink.

Smith continued his run in the Leeds side, as the club began to grow in stature. He showed his class in 2001 while helping to lead the Leeds side through the Champions League, though his experience ended on a sour note as he was sent off in the semi-final. The following season saw Smith switched to the right of midfield, his versatility being utilised by O'Leary, as the Leeds United manager tried to accommodate new signings. 2001 also saw Smith's break into the England national football team squad. An England youth international at multiple levels, Smith made his senior England debut in May 2001. He did not make the final cut for the 2002 FIFA World Cup, and accepted a position with the England Under-21 side. He scored four goals in a UEFA Cup tie at Hapoel Tel Aviv in November 2002. He signed a new three-and-a-half-year contract with Leeds in February 2003.

=== Manchester United ===
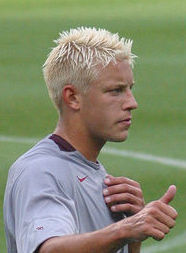
Smith training with Manchester United in 2004

As Leeds were relegated at the end of the 2003–04 season, Smith joined Manchester United for £7 million. Although this move caused controversy amongst Leeds fans, it has since been revealed by Peter Lorimer that the only club Leeds would allow Smith to join was Manchester United, and that Leeds had in fact engineered the move. With Manchester United being the only club offering the requested money up-front, instead of on an instalment basis (as offered by Everton and Newcastle United), and with Leeds facing administration, Smith faced allowing Leeds to go into administration or joining Leeds' bitter rivals - despite Smith earlier going on record that he would never play for Manchester United.

Smith's Manchester United career began on 8 August 2004, in the Community Shield clash against Arsenal, scoring for the club with a swerving volley in the 55th minute, as United lost 3–1. He scored his first league goal against Norwich City, scoring the winning goal with a "stunning volley" in the 49th minute, having earlier setting up a goal for David Bellion.

An injury hampered his first season, causing him to miss out on important matches such as the League Cup semi-final against Chelsea and the 2005 FA Cup final against Arsenal at the Millennium Stadium, which Manchester United lost on penalties. The forward scored 10 goals overall in his first season, but, with Wayne Rooney in good form and Ruud van Nistelrooy back in the team after injury, was relegated to the bench.

In the summer of 2005, it emerged that Manchester United manager Sir Alex Ferguson was grooming Smith as a successor to Roy Keane in the Manchester United midfield. Ferguson stated: "Roy sees characteristics in Alan that he saw in himself as a young player, which could help Alan develop into a very good player in that position." Smith got his chance to prove his credentials as a replacement for Keane when the Manchester United captain was injured early in the 2005–06 season. Smith began a prolonged run in the midfield 'anchor' role, with little effectiveness. The criticism aimed at Smith and his teammates reached its peak with United's 4–1 defeat away to Middlesbrough and the subsequent 1–0 defeat to Lille in the Champions League. Smith was believed to be one of several Manchester United stars who were heavily criticised by Keane, in an MUTV interview that was thought too explosive to be aired and consigned to the cutting room floor by club officials. It seemed that Smith's performance in the crucial home match against league leaders Chelsea would be meticulously scrutinised in the light of Keane's damning words. Smith responded in determined fashion, his performance in the 1–0 win resulting in The Guardian naming him as the man of the match.

He scored only one goal in 33 appearances in 2005–06, in a 3–1 away win over Charlton Athletic. On 18 February 2006, during a 1–0 defeat by Liverpool at Anfield in the FA Cup, Smith broke his leg and dislocated his ankle while attempting to block a free kick from Liverpool's John Arne Riise, an injury described by Ferguson as "one of the worst I've seen". Reports later confirmed by a spokesman for the Merseyside ambulance trust claimed Liverpool fans attacked Smith's ambulance as it left Anfield. Smith has since refuted these claims, though he had been given a general anaesthetic before he left the stadium so was not aware of the attack on the ambulance. He had an operation the next day, after which it was estimated that he would be out of the game for around nine months. A week later, Manchester United beat Wigan Athletic 4–0 in the League Cup final. After the match, Manchester United's players paid tribute to Smith by collecting the trophy in T-shirts printed with the words "For you Smudge" (Smith's nickname).

Ahead of the 2006–07 season, Ferguson sold Van Nistelrooy to Real Madrid and said he intended to replace him by returning Smith to his natural centre-forward position: "We are going to convert Alan Smith back into being a forward. He will be back in training soon and should be available by the end of August or the beginning of September." After three appearances for the reserves in August 2006, Smith returned to the Manchester United first team in September 2006, first as an unused substitute in the 3–2 home win over Celtic in the Champions League on 13 September, before taking the field for the last five minutes of the 1–0 away win over Benfica two weeks later.

Smith made his first start for eight months in Manchester United's 2–1 away win over Crewe Alexandra in the fourth round of the League Cup. However, he was still not fully match-fit and made only one substitute appearance in the next four months. As he continued his training, both Cardiff City and former club Leeds United expressed an interest in signing Smith on loan, but he said he intended to fight for his place in the Manchester United team.

Smith returned to action again in the second leg of the Champions League round of 16 tie against Lille on 7 March 2007, coming on for goalscorer Henrik Larsson in the 75th minute of the 1–0 win. He made his first start at Old Trafford since his injury on 14 March in a friendly against a Europe XI to commemorate 50 years since the signing of the Treaty of Rome. His first competitive start at Old Trafford, however, came on 19 March 2007 in an FA Cup quarter-final replay win over Middlesbrough.

After a succession of games in which he was either a substitute or substituted himself, Smith played the full 90 minutes of Manchester United's Champions League quarter-final second leg at home to Roma on 10 April 2007 as Manchester United won 7–1; he scored Manchester United's second goal in the 17th minute, his first goal since November 2005. He was then named in the starting line-up against Manchester City on 5 May 2007; United won the game 1–0 and were crowned league champions a day later, when Chelsea were held to a 1–1 draw at the Emirates Stadium against Arsenal.

Despite falling one game short of the 10 appearances needed to qualify for a Premier League winner's medal, the league granted special dispensation for Smith to receive a medal on the last day of the season. He made his last competitive appearance for Manchester United a week later in the 2007 FA Cup final against Chelsea, the first final played at the new Wembley Stadium, coming on for Darren Fletcher in the second minute of extra time.

=== Newcastle United ===
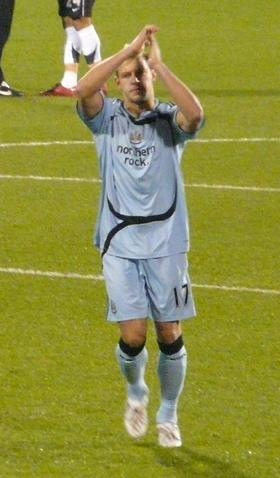
Smith applauding Newcastle supporters

Smith appeared in all four games of Manchester United's pre-season tour of the Far East, but on 2 August 2007, Newcastle United confirmed they had reached an agreement to sign Smith for around £6 million. The deal was confirmed on 3 August, with Smith moving to Newcastle on a five-year contract. He scored the winning goal on his debut for the Magpies, in a 1–0 friendly victory against Sampdoria. However, the striker struggled to establish himself at Newcastle in his first season, failing to score a league goal.

His progress the following season was hampered by stress fracture of the ankle sustained in the pre-season, meaning it took until February 2009 before he played in a competitive fixture by coming on as a substitute against Everton. Despite the comeback, Smith was relegated for the second time in his career as Newcastle lost by a single goal to Aston Villa. Again, he finished the season without a goal.

In the summer of 2009, Smith played against his former club Leeds United in a pre season friendly at St James Park, the match was the first time he had played against Leeds since leaving the club for bitter rivals Manchester United, his every touch was booed throughout the game by Leeds fans and he was heavily booed when he was substituted. Smith was made vice-captain for the 2009–10 season, but captained the team in almost every game due to Chris Hughton's preference of Smith to first choice captain Nicky Butt. Smith has been a regular feature, but in a much deeper role acting as a central defensive midfielder.

Despite playing regularly as a deep lying midfielder, he lost his place after the January transfer window with the arrival of Wayne Routledge and Danny Guthrie's excellent form in central midfield. To allow two strikers up front in the form of Peter Løvenkrands and Andy Carroll for more games, Smith was dropped to accommodate. Newcastle won promotion to the Premier League.

Smith started Newcastle's first four Premier League games due to the injury of Danny Guthrie, Smith partnered Joey Barton for the 3–0 loss to former club Manchester United, the 6–0 victory over Aston Villa, the 1–1 draw with Wolverhampton Wanderers and the 2–0 loss to Blackpool. He lost his place to new signing Cheick Tioté and the arrival of Hatem Ben Arfa. Smith was given time in the Football League Cup, where Chris Hughton gave young players and fringe players such as himself, Ryan Taylor and Peter Løvenkrands a chance.

With Tioté cementing his place as the in-form defensive midfielder, Smith served a lot of bench duty, although he saw a return to action in Newcastle's 3–1 cup defeat to Stevenage on 8 January 2011. With Tioté suspended for three games following his sending-off in the same game, Smith started in Newcastle's 1–1 derby draw with Sunderland, but came off after half an hour with an injured ankle, which was later confirmed to rule him out for the rest of the season.

After returning to full training in April 2011, it was reported by assistant manager John Carver that Smith would be in contention to start Newcastle's penultimate fixture to Chelsea with the club likely to rest Cheick Tioté to save him from a three-match ban.

On 7 June 2011, Smith was notified by the Newcastle management that his services would no longer be required, and he was free to leave the club.

On 8 June 2011, Leeds United chairman Ken Bates revealed that he was not ruling out a move to acquire Smith subject to his wage demands and fitness. After being made available for transfer, Smith was linked with a move to his former club Leeds United with Leeds manager Simon Grayson confirming his interest in the player.

Smith was released by Newcastle United on 1 June 2012.

=== Milton Keynes Dons ===
On 29 January 2012, Smith joined Milton Keynes Dons on loan until the end of the season. His first appearance was as a 50th-minute substitute for Adam Chicksen on 31 January 2012 in a League One game against Sheffield Wednesday. The game ended as a 1–1 draw. He made his first start for the club on 4 February 2012, playing 66 minutes of the 1–1 draw against Huddersfield Town, before being replaced by Jabo Ibehre. On 23 February 2012, Smith completed his first full 90 minutes for the Dons in the 2–1 win against Bury. The winning goal of the game came as a result of a penalty which Smith won just before half-time, after he was fouled by Bury goalkeeper Cameron Belford before Dean Bowditch duly converted the spot-kick. On 21 April, he scored his first goal in five years, in a 1–0 win against Sheffield United. On 15 May 2012 he came on as a substitute for MK Dons in the League One play-off semi-final against Huddersfield Town scoring with a diving header in injury time.

On 31 May 2012, it was reported that MK Dons manager Karl Robinson had opened talks with Smith's representatives over a permanent move to the club. Smith made 18 appearances after joining the club from Newcastle United in late January, scoring two goals in the process. The move was completed on 10 July, with Smith signing a two-year contract. Smith has taken control of MK Dons XI sides in the Berks & Bucks Cup, alongside former coach Ian Wright, as well as featuring in the unfamiliar position of centre back for a game. On 16 May 2014 Smith was released from the club along with three other players.

=== Notts County ===
Smith signed for Notts County on a one-year contract in 2014 as a player-coach. He signed a new one-year deal in May 2015. He had a short spell as caretaker manager of Notts County in 2017, but later reverted to the role of player-coach after the appointment of Kevin Nolan as manager.

He was released by Notts County at the end of the 2017–18 season.

== International career ==
An England youth international at multiple levels, Smith was called into the England squad for the friendly against Italy in November 2000, but later withdrew in order to rest. He eventually earned his first cap in May 2001 in a friendly against Mexico, but did not make the final cut for the 2002 FIFA World Cup, and continued representing the under-21s. Smith scored on his full debut against Portugal in September 2002, being set up by Leeds teammate Lee Bowyer. In a Euro 2004 qualifier against Macedonia in October 2002, he received his first international red card from a second yellow card after a tackle on Aleksandar Vasoski.

In August 2005, Smith drew some criticism after withdrawing from the England squad to play Denmark (a game England lost 4–1) in order to play for the Manchester United reserves. After a prolonged absence from international football, Smith was called up for an England B match on 26 May 2007, against Albania. He scored the first goal of the game which ended in a 3–1 win. The next day he was named in the senior team to face Brazil, on 1 June 2007.

== Post-playing career ==
As of December 2020, Smith lived in the Orlando, Florida, area working with male and female youngsters as a coach at the XL Soccer World Academy.

== Career statistics ==
=== Club ===
As of match played 12 May 2018

Appearances and goals by club, season and competition
Club	Season	League			FA Cup		League Cup		Europe		Other		Total	
Club	Season	Division	Apps	Goals	Apps	Goals	Apps	Goals	Apps	Goals	Apps	Goals	Apps	Goals
Leeds United	1998–99	Premier League	22	7	4	2	0	0	0	0	—		26	9
Leeds United	1999–2000	Premier League	26	4	3	1	1	0	8 (Note: Appearances in UEFA Cup)	1	—		38	6
Leeds United	2000–01	Premier League	33	11	2	0	1	0	16 (Note: Appearances in UEFA Champions League)	7	—		52	18
Leeds United	2001–02	Premier League	23	4	1	0	2	0	5	1	—		31	5
Leeds United	2002–03	Premier League	33	3	4	1	0	0	6	5	—		43	9
Leeds United	2003–04	Premier League	35	9	1	0	2	0	—		—		38	9
Leeds United	Total		172	38	15	4	6	0	35	14	—		228	56
Manchester United	2004–05	Premier League	31	6	3	0	2	1	5	2	1 (Note: Appearance in FA Community Shield)	1	42	10
Manchester United	2005–06	Premier League	21	1	2	0	2	0	8	0	—		33	1
Manchester United	2006–07	Premier League	9	0	3	0	2	0	4	1	—		18	1
Manchester United	Total		61	7	8	0	6	1	17	3	1	1	93	12
Newcastle United	2007–08	Premier League	33	0	2	0	2	0	—		—		37	0
Newcastle United	2008–09	Premier League	6	0	0	0	0	0	—		—		6	0
Newcastle United	2009–10	Championship	32	0	2	0	1	0	—		—		35	0
Newcastle United	2010–11	Premier League	11	0	1	0	2	0	—		—		14	0
Newcastle United	2011–12	Premier League	2	0	0	0	0	0	—		—		2	0
Newcastle United	Total		84	0	5	0	5	0	—		—		94	0
Milton Keynes Dons (loan)	2011–12	League One	16	1	—		—		––		2 (Note: Appearance in League One play-offs)	1	18	2
Milton Keynes Dons	2012–13	League One	27	1	6	0	2	0	—		1 (Note: Appearance(s) in EFL Trophy)	0	36	1
Milton Keynes Dons	2013–14	League One	24	0	2	0	1	0	—		2	0	29	0
Milton Keynes Dons	Total		67	2	8	0	3	0	—		5	1	83	3
Notts County	2014–15	League One	23	0	0	0	1	0	—		3	0	27	0
Notts County	2015–16	League Two	28	0	1	0	0	0	—		2	0	31	0
Notts County	2016–17	League Two	19	0	2	0	1	0	—		1	0	23	0
Notts County	2017–18	League Two	17	0	4	0	1	0	—		4 (Note: Three appearances and one goal in EFL Trophy, one in League Two play-offs)	1	26	1
Notts County	Total		87	0	7	0	3	0	—		10	1	107	1
Career total			471	47	43	4	23	1	52	17	16	3	605	72

=== International ===
Appearances and goals by national team and year
National team	Year	Apps	Goals
England	2001	3	0
England	2002	3	1
England	2003	0	0
England	2004	7	0
England	2005	3	0
England	2006	0	0
England	2007	3	0
Total		19	1

England score listed first, score column indicates score after each Smith goal.

International goals by date, venue, cap, opponent, score, result and competition
No.	Date	Venue	Cap	Opponent	Score	Result	Competition
1	7 September 2002	Villa Park, Birmingham, England	4	Portugal	1–0	1–1	Friendly

== Managerial statistics ==
As of match played 7 January 2017

Managerial record by team and tenure
Team	Nat	From	To	Record							
Team	Nat	From	To	G	W	D	L	GF	GA	GD	Win %
Notts County (caretaker)	(England)	3 January 2017	12 January 2017	1	0	0	1	1	4	−3	0.00
Total				1	0	0	1	1	4	−3	0.00

== Honours ==
Leeds United

- FA Youth Cup: 1996–97

Manchester United

- Premier League: 2006–07
- Football League Cup: 2005–06
- FA Cup runner-up: 2004–05, 2006–07

Newcastle United

- Football League Championship: 2009–10

Individual

- Premier League Player of the Month: August 2000
