= Dong Fangzhuo =

Chinese footballer (born 1985)

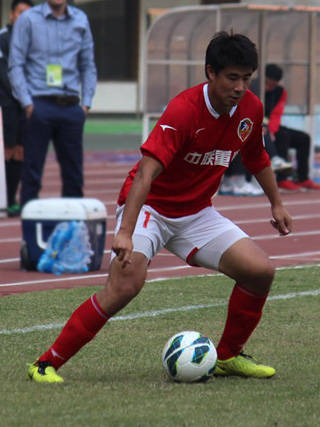
- Dong with Hunan Billows in 2013

Personal information
- Full name: Dong Fangzhuo
- Date of birth: 23 January 1985 (age 41)
- Place of birth: Dalian, Liaoning, China
- Height: 6 ft 0 in (1.83 m)
- Position: Striker

Senior career*
Years	Team	Apps	(Gls)
2002	Dalian Sidelong	18	(2)
2002–2004	Dalian Shide	8	(0)
2004–2008	Manchester United	1	(0)
2004–2007	→ Royal Antwerp (loan)	71	(34)
2008–2010	Dalian Shide	26	(0)
2010	Legia Warsaw	2	(0)
2010–2011	Portimonense	3	(0)
2011–2012	Mika	21	(4)
2012–2014	Hunan Billows	43	(9)
2014	Hebei Zhongji	7	(2)
Total		200	(51)

International career
2005	China U20	3	(0)
2008	China U23	3	(1)
2005–2008	China	13	(1)
Medal record
Representing China
Men's football
AFC Youth Championship
Silver medal – second place	2004 َ Malaysia	Team
- * Club domestic league appearances and goals

Dong Fangzhuo (Chinese: 董方卓; pinyin: Dǒng Fāngzhuó; born 23 January 1985) is a Chinese former professional footballer who played as a forward.

== Club career ==
=== Early career ===
Dong first came to prominence in 2000 when he was named the most valuable player in an under-17 tournament. He then signed for Dalian Sidelong and helped them finish as runners-up in the Chinese Jia-B league in 2002. This then earned him a move to Dalian Shide, the most successful club team in China. Dong scored his first goal for Dalian in the second match of the qualifying stages of the 2002–03 AFC Champions League.

=== Manchester United ===
Dong left Dalian for Manchester United on 12 January 2004 for an initial fee of £500,000, which could have risen to £3.5 million, depending upon appearances. He thus became the first East Asian player to sign for Manchester United.

After signing for Manchester United, he was unable to play for the senior team immediately because he was ineligible for a work permit. Due to these legal issues, Dong was loaned out to get first-team experience with Belgian First Division side Royal Antwerp where the employment laws were less strict. In his first season, he scored one goal in nine appearances as he began to get used to his new environment. His second season began more promisingly, finding the net in six of his first seven appearances of the season, all as a substitute off the bench. However, disrupted by injury and international duty, his form fell away in the latter half of the season as he finished with seven goals in 22 appearances in all competitions. At the beginning of the 2005–06 season, he was called up to join Manchester United on their pre-season tour and made his unofficial debut for the club in a friendly match in Hong Kong, scoring a goal in a 2–0 win.

In the 2005–06 season, Dong impressed for Royal Antwerp as he finished as the top goalscorer for both his team and the Belgian Second Division with 18 goals, including two hat-tricks. In 2006, he again joined Manchester United on a pre-season tour and scored the winner in a 1–0 win over Kaizer Chiefs. Manager Alex Ferguson remarked that Dong had the "speed and physicality" to play for United and hoped that he would be eligible to play for the club by December 2006. It was reported that Dong could obtain Belgian citizenship. However, this option would have caused Dong to lose his Chinese citizenship and was never considered. On 15 December 2006, almost three years after his original signing, Dong was finally given a work permit to play in England, having made enough appearances for the Chinese national team in the preceding two years. With his eligibility confirmed, he was recalled from Royal Antwerp having started the season with 11 goals in 15 appearances, given a new contract until 2010, and added to Manchester United's first-team squad on 17 January 2007.

Dong made his Old Trafford debut in a friendly charity match against a European XI on 13 March 2007, coming on as a substitute for Alan Smith in the 72nd minute of the 4–3 win. He was a regular for the Manchester United reserves, and on 9 May 2007, Dong made his Premier League debut, partnering Ole Gunnar Solskjær up front against Chelsea at Stamford Bridge. He made a further appearance for the club at Old Trafford, playing the entire match in a 2–0 defeat to Coventry City in the League Cup on 26 September 2007. On 12 December 2007, Dong made his first UEFA Champions League appearance as a substitute against Roma in the last group stage match of the 2007–08 season, replacing fellow striker Wayne Rooney. With that appearance, Dong became the second ever Chinese player to participate in the UEFA Champions League after Sun Xiang. However, he was able to score four goals in three matches for the reserves before suffering an injury.

Prior to the start of the 2008–09 season, Dong was not given a squad number, with the number 21 shirt given to Rafael. On 28 August 2008, Dong and Manchester United mutually agreed that his contract was to be terminated in order for him to find first-team football elsewhere.

=== Dalian Shide ===
On 27 August 2008, Dong returned to Dalian Shide. His experience at Manchester United meant that expectations of him were high, but his performances in the league upon his return were very poor. Dong struggled to score goals and was relegated to the reserves as a result. His poor performances in the league also prevented him from being called up for the Chinese national team.

=== Return to Europe ===
After attending a training camp with Polish club Legia Warsaw, Dong signed an 18-month deal with an option for two more years, depending on his performances with the club. Despite impressing in several pre-season friendlies, Dong looked desperately out of his depth in the league and managed to play in just two appearances before being dropped to the reserves. He was released by Legia on 1 August 2010. On the back of former teammate Cristiano Ronaldo's recommendation, Portuguese club Portimonense signed Dong to a one-year deal in August 2010. Dong was not used often and was on the bench for most of his time at Portimonense. He grew frustrated with his lack of playing time and terminated his contract with Portimonense. Dong immediately left Portmonense and he was briefly linked with Serbian SuperLiga's FK Sloboda Point Sevojno. Dong impressed again in Sloboda's friendlies and the Serbian news mentioned he was close to signing a contract. However, the club offered a long-term contract to Dong, but the player only wanted a short-term deal. Dong was reported to be asking for 10,000 Euro a week, but negotiations broke down and he was on his travels again.

In March 2011, Dong signed for Armenian Premier League side Mika, scoring in the 2011 Armenian Cup final. At the end of season, he left Mika for China League One side Hunan Billows. He played there for two years, scoring 9 goals before moving on to another Chinese second-tier team, Hebei Zhongji, scoring 2 in 7.

== International career ==
Dong was called up by Chinese under-20 national team to participate in the 2005 FIFA World Youth Championship. He came off the bench to play in three out of the four matches during the tournament. Dong scored his first goal for the Chinese national team in a 4–1 loss to Switzerland on 3 June 2006 and was also called up for the 2007 AFC Asian Cup. Dong competed in the 2008 Summer Olympics. In the team's opening match against New Zealand, he was substituted on for Han Peng and went on to score China's first goal in the 88th minute, securing a 1–1 draw.

== Career statistics ==
=== International ===
Appearances and goals by national team and year
National team	Year	Apps	Goals
China
China	2005	1	0
China	2006	7	1
China	2007	5	0
Total		13	1

Scores and results list China's goal tally first, score column indicates score after each Fangzhuo goal

List of international goals scored by Dong Fangzhuo
No.	Date	Venue	Opponent	Score	Result	Competition	Ref.
1	3 June 2006	Hardturm, Zürich, Switzerland	Switzerland	1–4	1–4	Friendly	

== Honours ==
FC Mika

- Armenian Cup: 2011

Manchester United

- Premier League: 2006–07
- UEFA Champions League: 2007-2008
