= 2005–06 Aris Thessaloniki F.C. season =

Aris Thessaloniki
- President: Lambros Skordas
- Manager: Nikos Anastopoulos
- Stadium: Kleanthis Vikelidis Stadium
- Beta Ethniki: 3rd (promoted)
- Greek Cup: Second round
- UEFA Cup: First round
- Top goalscorer: League: Avraam Papadopoulos (7); All: Avraam Papadopoulos (7)
Home colours	Away colours

The 2005–06 season was the 92nd season in Aris Thessaloniki F.C.'s existence. The club finished 3rd in the Beta Ethniki and promoted to Super League for the next season.

Aris Thessaloniki was eliminated in Second round of Greek Football Cup by Panthrakikos.

As runners-up of the Greek Cup in previous season, Aris Thessaloniki qualified in to First round of UEFA Cup. The club were eliminated by the Italian Roma.

== Competitions ==
=== Overall ===
Competition	Started round	Current position / round	Final position / round	First match	Last match
Beta Ethniki	Matchday 1	—	3rd	24 September 2005	14 May 2006
Greek Cup	Second round	—	Second round	1 September 2005	1 September 2005
UEFA Cup	First round	—	First round	15 September 2005	29 September 2005

Updated to match played 14 May 2006
Source: Competitions

=== Overview ===
Competition	Record							
Competition	G	W	D	L	GF	GA	GD	Win %
Beta Ethniki	30	14	12	4	33	17	+16	46.67
Greek Cup	1	0	0	1	1	2	−1	0.00
UEFA Cup	2	0	1	1	1	5	−4	0.00
Total	33	14	13	6	35	24	+11	42.42

Updated to match played 14 May 2006
Source: Competitions

=== Beta Ethniki ===
==== League table ====
Pos	Team	Pld	W	D	L	GF	GA	GD	Pts	Promotion or relegation
1	Ergotelis (C, P)	30	16	8	6	41	23	+18	56	Promotion to Super League
2	Kerkyra (P)	30	17	5	8	38	26	+12	56	Promotion to Super League
3	Aris Thessaloniki (P)	30	14	12	4	33	17	+16	54	Promotion to Super League
4	Thrasyvoulos	30	15	8	7	40	25	+15	53	
5	Veria	30	10	11	9	28	27	+1	41	
6	Kastoria	30	10	10	10	28	28	0	40	
7	Ilisiakos	30	11	7	12	43	35	+8	40	
8	Kalamata	30	9	12	9	26	28	−2	39	
9	Ethnikos Asteras	30	8	14	8	36	40	−4	38	
10	Niki Volos	30	9	11	10	32	31	+1	38	
11	Proodeftiki	30	9	11	10	31	34	−3	38	
12	Haidari	30	9	10	11	27	27	0	37	
13	Panserraikos	30	10	7	13	28	37	−9	37	
14	ASK Olympiacos (R)	30	10	7	13	30	37	−7	37	Relegation to Gamma Ethniki
15	Panachaiki (R)	30	9	7	14	24	29	−5	34	Relegation to Gamma Ethniki
16	Paniliakos (Note: Paniliakos had 1 point deducted.) (R)	30	2	4	24	16	57	−41	9	Relegation to Gamma Ethniki

(C) Champions; (P) Promoted; (R) Relegated

=== Greek Cup ===
==== Matches ====
1 September 2005 Second round	Panthrakikos	2–1	Aris	Komotini
13:00 EEST	Souanis 27'; Mouratidis 41'	https://www.in.gr/2005/09/02/sports/apo-ton-panthrakiko-i-ekpliksi-apekleise-ton-ari-apo-toys-32/ https://web.archive.org/web/20080921042349/http://www.epo.gr/cup/05_06/3rd_01-09.asp	Cáceres 61'	Stadium: Komotini Municipal Stadium; Referee: Theodoros Gaitatzis (Drama)

== Squad statistics ==
=== Appearances ===
Players with no appearances not included in the list.

As of match played 14 May 2006

#	Position	Nat.	Player	Beta Ethniki	Greek Cup	UEFA Cup	Total
2	MF	(Greece)	Dimitris Tsagarakis	3	0	0	3
3	DF	(France)	Derek Decamps	18	0	1	19
4	DF	(Greece) / (Australia)	Avraam Papadopoulos	25	0	2	27
5	DF	(Greece)	Spyros Gogolos	24	1	1	26
6	MF	(Bolivia)	Nacho García	15	1	1	17
8	FW	(Greece)	Agapitos Abelas	23	1	1	25
9	MF	(Greece)	Petros Passalis	5	1	1	7
10	MF	(Argentina)	Fernando Sanjurjo	12	1	1	14
11	MF	(Greece)	Charalampos Moysiadis	26	1	2	29
14	MF	(Greece) / (United States)	Peter Philipakos	6	0	0	6
14	FW	(Argentina)	Nicolás Tagliani	2	0	0	2
15	GK	(Greece)	Vangelis Pourliotopoulos	2	1	1	4
17	DF	(Ivory Coast) / (France)	Gilles Domoraud	29	1	2	32
18	FW	(Chile)	Mario Cáceres	21	1	2	24
19	FW	(Greece)	Ioakim Beniskos	18	1	1	20
20	FW	(Greece)	Michalis Bolos	2	0	1	3
23	DF	(Greece)	Giorgos Koltsidas	27	1	1	29
25	DF	(Uruguay) / (Italy)	Sebastián Flores	4	0	0	4
26	FW	(Croatia)	Ivan Djurdjek	4	0	0	4
29	FW	(Greece)	Georgios Gougoulias	23	1	1	25
30	DF	(Greece)	Christos Naidos	6	0	2	8
31	GK	(Greece)	Dimitrios Karatziovalis	1	0	1	2
32	DF	(Albania)	Kristi Vangjeli	17	0	1	18
33	FW	(Greece)	Christos Velonis	19	1	1	21
43	DF	(Greece)	Efthymis Kouloucheris	3	0	0	3
44	MF	(Greece)	Konstantinos Nebegleras	28	1	2	31
75	GK	(Slovakia)	Juraj Buček	28	0	0	28
90	FW	(Greece)	Nikos Skarmoutsos	13	0	0	13
99	MF	(Portugal)	Paulo Costa	13	0	0	13
Total				30	1	2	33

=== Goals ===
As of match played 14 May 2006

Ranking	Position	Nat.	Player	Beta Ethniki	Greek Cup	UEFA Cup	Total
1	DF	(Greece) / (Australia)	Avraam Papadopoulos	7	0	0	7
2	FW	(Greece)	Georgios Gougoulias	6	0	0	6
3	DF	(Ivory Coast) / (France)	Gilles Domoraud	4	0	0	4
3	FW	(Chile)	Mario Cáceres	3	1	0	4
5	FW	(Greece)	Nikos Skarmoutsos	3	0	0	3
6	MF	(Greece)	Konstantinos Nebegleras	2	0	0	2
6	FW	(Greece)	Christos Velonis	2	0	0	2
6	MF	(Argentina)	Fernando Sanjurjo	1	0	1	2
9	DF	(France)	Derek Decamps	1	0	0	1
9	FW	(Greece)	Ioakim Beniskos	1	0	0	1
9	DF	(Greece)	Spyros Gogolos	1	0	0	1
9	MF	(Bolivia)	Nacho García	1	0	0	1
9	MF	(Portugal)	Paulo Costa	1	0	0	1
Own Goals				0	0	0	0
Total				33	1	1	35
