= 2006–07 Aris Thessaloniki F.C. season =

Aris Thessaloniki
- President: Lambros Skordas
- Manager: Guillermo Hoyos (until 9 January 2007); Nikos Pasialis (from 10 January 2007 until 15 January 2007); Quique Hernández (from 16 January 2007)
- Stadium: Kleanthis Vikelidis Stadium
- Super League: 4th
- Greek Cup: Fourth round
- Top goalscorer: League: Sergio Koke (10); All: Sergio Koke (10)
Home colours	Away colours

The 2006–07 season was the 93rd season in Aris Thessaloniki F.C.'s existence. The club finished 4th in the Super League. The club qualified in to the UEFA Cup of the next season.

Aris Thessaloniki was eliminated in Fourth round of Greek Football Cup by Niki Volos.

== First-team squad ==
Table includes all players who were part of the team for that season

#	Name	Nationality	Position(s)	Date of birth (age)	Signed from
Goalkeepers
1	Kostas Chalkias	(Greece)	GK	30 May 1974 (aged 33)	(Spain) Real Murcia
31	Dimitrios Karatziovalis	(Greece)	GK	22 July 1975 (aged 31)	(Greece) Apollon Kalamarias
38	Kyriakos Stratilatis	(Greece)	GK	5 January 1988 (aged 19)	Club's Academy
41	Alexandre Negri	(Brazil)	GK	27 March 1981 (aged 26)	(Brazil) Fortaleza
Defenders
2	Adorcelino Tuta	(Brazil)	RB	17 March 1984 (aged 23)	(Brazil) Porto Alegre
4	Avraam Papadopoulos	(Greece) / (Australia)	CB / DM	3 December 1984 (aged 22)	Club's Academy
5	Spyros Gogolos	(Greece)	CB	11 August 1978 (aged 28)	(Greece) Kallithea
11	Efthymis Kouloucheris	(Greece)	CB / DM	10 March 1981 (aged 26)	(Greece) Olympiacos
13	Theodoros Papadopoulos	(Greece)	LB	11 August 1987 (aged 19)	Club's Academy
15	Nikos Karabelas	(Greece)	LB / LM	20 December 1984 (aged 22)	(Greece) Paniliakos
23	Giorgos Koltsidas	(Greece)	CB / RB	23 September 1970 (aged 36)	(Greece) Trikala
25	Paulo Edson Tinga	(Brazil)	LB	15 March 1981 (aged 26)	(Brazil) Veranópolis
30	Christos Naidos	(Greece)	LB	24 December 1979 (aged 27)	(Greece) Agrotikos Asteras
32	Kristi Vangjeli	(Albania)	CB / RB / LB	5 September 1985 (aged 21)	Club's Academy
80	Pablo Coira	(Spain)	RB	18 October 1979 (aged 27)	(Spain) Recreativo de Huelva
Midfielders
6	Konstantinos Nebegleras (captain)	(Greece)	DM	14 April 1975 (aged 32)	(Greece) Iraklis
8	Nacho García (vice-captain)	(Bolivia)	CM / DM	17 December 1980 (aged 26)	(Bolivia) Oriente Petrolero
9	Petros Passalis	(Greece)	DM	10 April 1974 (aged 33)	(Greece) Olympiacos
10	Paulo Costa	(Portugal)	AM / CM	5 December 1979 (aged 27)	(France) Bordeaux
14	Christos Marangos	(Cyprus)	CM	9 May 1983 (aged 24)	(Cyprus) Anorthosis Famagusta
18	Aarón Escudero	(Spain)	AM	21 January 1984 (aged 23)	(Spain) Real Madrid Castilla
21	Rogério Belém	(Brazil)	AM	28 March 1975 (aged 32)	(Brazil) CA Juventus
26	Rubén Palazuelos	(Spain)	CM	11 April 1983 (aged 24)	(Spain) Gimnástica
28	Jonan García	(Spain)	AM	8 January 1983 (aged 24)	(Spain) Ciudad de Murcia
Forwards
3	Álex Pérez	(Spain)	LW	21 January 1985 (aged 22)	(Spain) Real Madrid Castilla
7	Tasos Kyriakos	(Greece)	RW / AM	14 August 1978 (aged 28)	(Greece) Olympiacos
16	José Reyes	(Spain) / (Germany)	RW / ST	5 October 1981 (aged 25)	(Spain) CD Ronda
19	Thanasis Papazoglou	(Greece)	ST	30 March 1988 (aged 19)	Club's Academy
20	Javito Peral	(Spain)	LW / RW	4 November 1983 (aged 23)	(Spain) Barcelona B
22	Guilherme Weisheimer	(Brazil)	ST	22 October 1981 (aged 25)	(Brazil) Grêmio
27	Sergio Koke	(Spain)	ST / SS	27 April 1983 (aged 24)	(France) Olympique de Marseille
29	Georgios Gougoulias	(Greece)	ST	2 July 1983 (aged 23)	(Greece) Pavlos Melas
33	Christos Velonis	(Greece)	ST	21 April 1978 (aged 29)	(Greece) Agrotikos Asteras
99	Carlos Ferrari Cacá	(Brazil) / (Italy)	ST	27 April 1983 (aged 24)	(Spain) Alicante

== Competitions ==
=== Overall ===
Competition	Started round	Current position / round	Final position / round	First match	Last match
Super League	Matchday 1	—	4th	20 August 2006	13 May 2007
Greek Cup	Fourth Round	—	Fourth Round	15 November 2006	15 November 2006

Updated to match played 13 May 2007
Source: Competitions

=== Overview ===
Competition	Record							
Competition	G	W	D	L	GF	GA	GD	Win %
Super League	30	11	13	6	32	26	+6	36.67
Greek Cup	1	0	0	1	0	2	−2	0.00
Total	31	11	13	7	32	28	+4	35.48

Updated to match played 13 May 2007
Source: Competitions

==== Managers' overview ====
===== Guillermo Hoyos =====
Competition	Record							
Competition	G	W	D	L	GF	GA	GD	Win %
Super League	16	3	10	3	14	15	−1	18.75
Greek Cup	1	0	0	1	0	2	−2	0.00
Total	17	3	10	4	14	17	−3	17.65

Updated to match played 9 January 2007
Source: Competitions

===== Nikos Pasialis =====
Competition	Record							
Competition	G	W	D	L	GF	GA	GD	Win %
Super League	1	0	1	0	1	1	+0	0.00
Greek Cup	0	0	0	0	0	0	+0	—
Total	1	0	1	0	1	1	+0	0.00

Updated to match played 15 January 2007
Source: Competitions

===== Quique Hernández =====
Competition	Record							
Competition	G	W	D	L	GF	GA	GD	Win %
Super League	13	8	2	3	17	10	+7	61.54
Greek Cup	0	0	0	0	0	0	+0	—
Total	13	8	2	3	17	10	+7	61.54

Updated to match played 13 May 2007
Source: Competitions

=== Super League ===
==== League table ====
Pos	Team	Pld	W	D	L	GF	GA	GD	Pts	Qualification or relegation
2	AEK Athens	30	18	8	4	60	27	+33	62	Qualification for the Champions League third qualifying round
3	Panathinaikos	30	16	6	8	47	28	+19	54	Qualification for the UEFA Cup first round
4	Aris	30	11	13	6	32	26	+6	46	Qualification for the UEFA Cup first round
5	Panionios	30	12	9	9	33	31	+2	45 (Note: Head-to-head record: PAOK–Panionios 1–1, Panionios–PAOK 3–1.)	Qualification for the UEFA Cup first round
6	PAOK	30	13	6	11	32	29	+3	45	

Source: Super League Greece
Rules for classification: 1st points; 2nd head-to-head points; 3rd head-to-head goal difference; 4th decision match.

==== Results summary ====
Overall								Home						Away					
Pld	W	D	L	GF	GA	GD	Pts	W	D	L	GF	GA	GD	W	D	L	GF	GA	GD
30	11	13	6	32	26	+6	46	8	4	3	22	15	+7	3	9	3	10	11	−1

Last updated: 13 May 2007.
Source: Super League

==== Matches ====
20 August 2006 1	AEL	1 – 1	Aris Thessaloniki	Larissa
19:00	Angelos Digozis 62' (pen.)	Report	Paulo Costa 25'	Stadium: Alcazar Stadium; Referee: Michalis Germanakos

27 August 2006 2	Aris Thessaloniki	0 – 0	Kerkyra	Thessaloniki
17:00		Report		Stadium: Kleanthis Vikelidis Stadium; Referee: Iraklis Tsikinis

10 September 2006 3	Egaleo	1 – 1	Aris Thessaloniki	Athens
17:00	Anestis Agritis 41'	Report	Avraam Papadopoulos 22'	Stadium: Stavros Mavrothalassitis Stadium; Referee: Anastasios Kakos

16 September 2006 4	Aris Thessaloniki	1 – 0	Ionikos	Thessaloniki
17:00	Rogério Belém 88'	Report		Stadium: Kleanthis Vikelidis Stadium; Referee: Michail Koukoulakis

24 September 2006 5	Skoda Xanthi	1 – 1	Aris Thessaloniki	Xanthi
17:00	Stavros Labriakos 45'	Report	Sergio Koke 65'	Stadium: Xanthi FC Arena; Referee: Georgios Kasnaferis

30 September 2006 6	Aris Thessaloniki	2 – 2	Panionios	Thessaloniki
17:00	Sergio Koke 62'; Avraam Papadopoulos 90' (pen.)	Report	Fanouris Goundoulakis 53'; Christos Aravidis 69'	Stadium: Kleanthis Vikelidis Stadium; Referee: Ilias Mazarakos

21 October 2006 7	Aris Thessaloniki	0 – 0	PAOK	Thessaloniki
17:00		Report		Stadium: Kleanthis Vikelidis Stadium; Referee: Kyros Vassaras

29 October 2006 8	OFI Crete	1 – 0	Aris Thessaloniki	Heraklion
17:00	Goran Drulić 67'	Report		Stadium: Theodoros Vardinogiannis Stadium; Referee: Ioannis Stavridis

5 November 2006 9	Aris Thessaloniki	1 – 3	AEK Athens	Thessaloniki
17:00	Tasos Kyriakos 5'	Report	Nikos Liberopoulos 58'; Júlio César 69'; Leonidas Kampantais 77'	Stadium: Kleanthis Vikelidis Stadium; Referee: Giannis Tsachilidis

11 November 2006 10	Iraklis	0 – 0	Aris Thessaloniki	Thessaloniki
17:00		Report		Stadium: Kaftanzoglio Stadium; Referee: Georgios Kasnaferis

18 November 2006 11	Aris Thessaloniki	2 – 3	Olympiacos	Thessaloniki
17:00	Sergio Koke 30', 44'	Report	Rivaldo 61', 66'; Nery Castillo 81'	Stadium: Kleanthis Vikelidis Stadium; Referee: Christoforos Zografos

25 November 2006 12	Ergotelis	0 – 1	Aris Thessaloniki	Heraklion
17:00		Report	Paulo Costa 6'	Stadium: Pankritio Stadium; Referee: Konstantinos Finokaliotis

3 December 2006 13	Aris Thessaloniki	1 – 0	Panathinaikos	Thessaloniki
17:00	Guilherme Weisheimer 54'	Report		Stadium: Kleanthis Vikelidis Stadium; Referee: Vasileios Terovitsas

10 December 2006 14	Apollon Kalamarias	1 – 1	Aris Thessaloniki	Thessaloniki
13:00	Dimitrios Orfanos 59'	Report	Sergio Koke 7'	Stadium: Kalamaria Stadium; Referee: Michalis Germanakos

16 December 2006 15	Atromitos	1 – 1	Aris Thessaloniki	Athens
13:00	Ioannis Lazanas 14'	Report	Javito Peral 40'	Stadium: Peristeri Stadium; Referee: Anastasios Kakos

7 January 2007 16	Aris Thessaloniki	1 – 1	AEL	Thessaloniki
17:00	Sergio Koke 70'	Report	Cleyton 66'	Stadium: Kleanthis Vikelidis Stadium; Referee: Lazaros Polatian

14 January 2007 17	Kerkyra	1 – 1	Aris Thessaloniki	Kerkyra
13:00	Adam Foti 55' (pen.)	Report	Sergio Koke 1'	Stadium: Kerkyra Stadium; Referee: Vasilios Skoufitsas

20 January 2007 18	Aris Thessaloniki	3 – 1	Egaleo	Thessaloniki
17:00	Sergio Koke 8'; Nacho García 43'; Paulo Costa 45'	Report	Sotiris Tsatsos 82'	Stadium: Kleanthis Vikelidis Stadium; Referee: Georgios Daloukas

28 January 2007 19	Ionikos	0 – 1	Aris Thessaloniki	Athens
14:45		Report	Nacho García 67'	Stadium: Neapoli Stadium; Referee: Lazaros Polatian

4 February 2007 20	Aris Thessaloniki	1 – 0	Skoda Xanthi	Thessaloniki
17:00	Efthymis Kouloucheris 80'	Report		Stadium: Kleanthis Vikelidis Stadium; Referee: Konstantinos Papastamatis

10 February 2007 21	Panionios	0 – 0	Aris Thessaloniki	Athens
17:00		Report		Stadium: Nea Smyrni Stadium; Referee: Theodoros Gaitatzis

17 February 2007 22	PAOK	1 – 0	Aris Thessaloniki	Thessaloniki
17:00	Christos Melissis 22'	Report		Stadium: Toumba Stadium; Referee: Georgios Kasnaferis

25 February 2007 23	Aris Thessaloniki	3 – 1	OFI Crete	Thessaloniki
17:00	Sergio Koke 12'; Paulo Costa 42', 61' (pen.)	Report	Peter Ofori-Quaye 49'	Stadium: Kleanthis Vikelidis Stadium; Referee: Ilias Mazarakos

3 March 2007 24	AEK Athens	3 – 1	Aris Thessaloniki	Athens
17:00	Gustavo Manduca 54' (pen.); Nikos Liberopoulos 74'; Pantelis Kapetanos 89'	Report	Rogério Belém 87'	Stadium: Athens Olympic Stadium; Referee: Georgios Daloukas

11 March 2007 25	Aris Thessaloniki	1 – 0	Iraklis	Thessaloniki
17:00	Paulo Costa 16'	Report		Stadium: Kleanthis Vikelidis Stadium; Referee: Athanassios Briakos

18 March 2007 26	Olympiacos	0 – 0	Aris Thessaloniki	Piraeus
17:00		Report		Stadium: Karaiskakis Stadium; Referee: Lazaros Polatian

18 April 2007 27	Aris Thessaloniki	2 – 0	Ergotelis	Thessaloniki
17:00	Sergio Koke 19'; Javito Peral 29'	Report		Stadium: Kleanthis Vikelidis Stadium

22 April 2007 28	Panathinaikos	0 – 1	Aris Thessaloniki	Athens
17:00		Report	Rogério Belém 89'	Stadium: Leoforos Alexandras Stadium; Referee: Iraklis Tsikinis

29 April 2007 29	Aris Thessaloniki	3 – 2	Apollon Kalamarias	Thessaloniki
17:00	Rogério Belém 1'; Paulo Costa 5'; Javito Peral 63'	Report	Emanuel Perrone 15'; Jean Marie Sylla 42'	Stadium: Kleanthis Vikelidis Stadium; Referee: Michalis Germanakos

13 May 2007 30	Aris Thessaloniki	1 – 2	Atromitos	Thessaloniki
17:00	Georgios Gougoulias 72'	Report	Giannis Katemis 38'; Ioannis Lazanas 43'	Stadium: Kleanthis Vikelidis Stadium; Referee: Vasilios Skoufitsas

=== Greek Football Cup ===
==== Fourth Round ====
15 November 2006 Fourth Round	Niki Volos	2 – 0 (a.e.t.)	Aris Thessaloniki	Volos
18:00	Anastasios Pavlidis 96'; Charalampos Pittakas 102'	(in Greek)		Stadium: Panthessaliko Stadium; Referee: Lazaros Polatian

== Squad statistics ==
=== Appearances ===
Players with no appearances not included in the list.

As of match played 13 May 2007

#	Position	Nat.	Player	Super League	Greek Cup	Total
1	GK	(Greece)	Kostas Chalkias	29	0	29
2	DF	(Brazil)	Adorcelino Tuta	16	0	16
3	FW	(Spain)	Álex Pérez	5	0	5
4	DF	(Greece) / (Australia)	Avraam Papadopoulos	23	1	24
5	DF	(Greece)	Spyros Gogolos	9	0	9
6	MF	(Greece)	Konstantinos Nebegleras	27	1	28
7	FW	(Greece)	Tasos Kyriakos	10	1	11
8	MF	(Bolivia)	Nacho García	20	0	20
9	MF	(Greece)	Petros Passalis	9	1	10
10	MF	(Portugal)	Paulo Costa	29	0	29
11	DF	(Greece)	Efthymis Kouloucheris	25	1	26
14	MF	(Cyprus)	Christos Marangos	7	1	8
15	DF	(Greece)	Nikos Karabelas	1	0	1
16	FW	(Spain) / (Germany)	José Reyes	10	1	11
18	MF	(Spain)	Aarón Escudero	2	0	2
20	FW	(Spain)	Javito Peral	29	1	30
21	MF	(Brazil)	Rogério Belém	20	0	20
22	FW	(Brazil)	Guilherme Weisheimer	14	1	15
23	DF	(Greece)	Giorgos Koltsidas	15	0	15
25	DF	(Brazil)	Paulo Edson Tinga	18	1	19
26	MF	(Spain)	Rubén Palazuelos	21	1	22
27	FW	(Spain)	Sergio Koke	29	1	30
28	MF	(Spain)	Jonan García	11	0	11
29	FW	(Greece)	Georgios Gougoulias	5	0	5
30	DF	(Greece)	Christos Naidos	2	0	2
32	DF	(Albania)	Kristi Vangjeli	18	1	19
33	FW	(Greece)	Christos Velonis	3	0	3
41	GK	(Brazil)	Alexandre Negri	1	1	2
80	DF	(Spain)	Pablo Coira	8	0	8
99	FW	(Brazil) / (Italy)	Carlos Ferrari Cacá	2	0	2
Total				30	1	31

=== Goals ===
As of match played 13 May 2007

Ranking	Position	Nat.	Player	Super League	Greek Cup	Total
1	FW	(Spain)	Sergio Koke	10	0	10
2	MF	(Portugal)	Paulo Costa	7	0	7
3	MF	(Brazil)	Rogério Belém	4	0	4
4	FW	(Spain)	Javito Peral	3	0	3
5	DF	(Greece) / (Australia)	Avraam Papadopoulos	2	0	2
5	MF	(Bolivia)	Nacho García	2	0	2
7	DF	(Greece)	Efthymis Kouloucheris	1	0	1
7	FW	(Greece)	Tasos Kyriakos	1	0	1
7	FW	(Greece)	Georgios Gougoulias	1	0	1
7	FW	(Brazil)	Guilherme Weisheimer	1	0	1
Own Goals				0	0	0
Total				32	0	32
