= 2008–09 Aris Thessaloniki F.C. season =

Aris Thessaloniki
- President: Lambros Skordas
- Manager: Quique Hernández (until 20 January 2009); Iomar Mazinho (from 21 January 2009)
- Stadium: Kleanthis Vikelidis Stadium
- Super League: 6th
- Greek Cup: Fifth round
- UEFA Cup: Second qualifying round
- Top goalscorer: League: Javito Peral; Sergio Koke; Javier Cámpora (5); All: Javito Peral; Sergio Koke (6)
Home colours	Away colours

The 2008-09 season was the 95th season in Aris Thessaloniki F.C.'s existence. The club finished 6th in the Super League.

Aris Thessaloniki was eliminated on penalties in the fifth round of Greek Football Cup by PAOK. On the UEFA Cup, the croatian Slaven Koprivnica eliminated Aris Thessaloniki in the Second qualifying round.

Dušan Bajević removed from manager's position in July. Quique Hernández came after him. In January, Quique Hernández replaced by Iomar Mazinho and his assistant Donato Gama

Aris Thessaloniki hired Giorgos Koltsidas as technical director after his retirement as player.

== First-team squad ==
#	Name	Nationality	Position(s)	Date of birth (age)	Signed from
Goalkeepers
13	Michalis Sifakis	(Greece)	GK	9 September 1984 (aged 24)	(Greece) OFI
31	Dimitrios Karatziovalis	(Greece)	GK	22 July 1975 (aged 33)	(Greece) Apollon Kalamarias
40	Stivi Frashëri	(Albania)	GK	29 August 1990 (aged 18)	Club's Academy
Defenders
2	Darcy Dolce Neto	(Brazil)	RB / RW	7 February 1981 (aged 28)	(Brazil) Santos
3	Efthymis Kouloucheris	(Greece)	CB / DM	10 March 1981 (aged 28)	(Greece) Olympiacos
4	Alejandro Lembo	(Uruguay) / (Italy)	CB	15 February 1978 (aged 31)	(Uruguay) Danubio
5	Ronaldo Guiaro	(Brazil) / (Portugal)	CB	18 February 1974 (aged 35)	(Brazil) Santos
15	Nikos Karabelas	(Greece)	LB / LM	20 December 1984 (aged 24)	(Greece) Paniliakos
21	Valentin Roberge	(France)	CB / LB	9 June 1987 (aged 21)	(France) Paris Saint-Germain B
26	Sanel Jahić	(Bosnia and Herzegovina) / (France)	CB / RB / DM	10 December 1981 (aged 27)	(Bosnia and Herzegovina) Željezničar
32	Kristi Vangjeli	(Albania)	CB / RB / LB	5 September 1985 (aged 23)	Club's Academy
Midfielders
8	Nacho García (captain)	(Bolivia)	CM / DM	17 December 1980 (aged 28)	(Bolivia) Oriente Petrolero
9	Thiago Gentil	(Brazil) / (Italy)	AM / SS / LW	8 April 1980 (aged 29)	(Brazil) Figueirense
11	Diogo Siston	(Brazil)	AM	25 January 1981 (aged 28)	(Portugal) Santa Clara
24	Víctor Vitolo	(Spain)	CM	9 September 1983 (aged 25)	(Spain) Racing de Santander
29	Sakis Prittas	(Greece)	CM / DM	9 January 1979 (aged 30)	(Greece) Iraklis
30	Roberto Battión	(Argentina)	CM / DM	1 March 1982 (aged 27)	(Argentina) Argentinos Juniors
Forwards
7	Toni Calvo	(Spain)	RW / LW	28 March 1987 (aged 22)	(Spain) Barcelona B
10	Sergio Koke (vice-captain)	(Spain)	ST / SS	27 April 1983 (aged 26)	(France) Olympique de Marseille
12	Mario Regueiro	(Uruguay) / (Spain)	LW / SS / AM	14 September 1978 (aged 30)	(Spain) Valencia
17	Piotr Włodarczyk	(Poland)	ST	4 May 1977 (aged 32)	(Poland) Zagłębie Lubin
18	Javier Cámpora	(Argentina)	ST	7 January 1980 (aged 29)	(Mexico) Chiapas
19	Thanasis Papazoglou	(Greece)	ST	30 March 1988 (aged 21)	Club's Academy
20	Javito Peral	(Spain)	LW / RW	4 November 1983 (aged 25)	(Spain) Barcelona B
33	Stavros Labriakos	(Greece)	ST	30 November 1975 (aged 33)	(Greece) Skoda Xanthi

== Transfers and loans ==
=== Transfers in ===
Entry date	Position	No.	Player	From club	Fee	Ref.
June 2008	MF	30	(Argentina) Roberto Battión	(Argentina) Argentinos Juniors	Free	
June 2008	FW	17	(Poland) Piotr Włodarczyk	(Poland) Zagłębie Lubin	Free	
July 2008	DF	4	(Uruguay) / (Italy) Alejandro Lembo	(Uruguay) Danubio	Free	
July 2008	FW	99	(Argentina) / (Italy) Alejandro Delorte	(Argentina) Argentinos Juniors	Free	
July 2008	FW	12	(Uruguay) / (Spain) Mario Regueiro	(Spain) Valencia	100.000 €	
July 2008	GK	13	(Greece) Michalis Sifakis	(Greece) OFI	300.000 €	
July 2008	DF	21	(France) Valentin Roberge	(France) Paris Saint-Germain B	Free	
January 2009	FW	33	(Greece) Stavros Labriakos	(Greece) Skoda Xanthi	Free	
January 2009	FW	18	(Argentina) Javier Cámpora	(Mexico) Chiapas	Free	

=== Transfers out ===
Exit date	Position	No.	Player	To club	Fee	Ref.
June 2008	DF	23	(Greece) Giorgos Koltsidas	Retired		
July 2008	DF	4	(Greece) / (Australia) Avraam Papadopoulos	(Greece) Olympiacos	2.500.000 €	
July 2008	GK	1	(Greece) Kostas Chalkias	(Greece) PAOK	Released	
July 2008	GK	38	(Greece) Kyriakos Stratilatis	(Greece) Levadiakos	Released	
July 2008	DF	13	(Greece) Theodoros Papadopoulos	(Greece) Apollon Kalamarias	Released	
July 2008	MF	18	(Serbia) Vladimir Ivić	(Greece) PAOK	Released	
July 2008	FW	17	(Greece) Giannis Gesios	(Greece) PAONE	Released	
September 2008	FW	30	(Brazil) / (Italy) Márcio Amoroso	Free Agent	Released	
October 2008	DF	22	(Brazil) / (Portugal) Marco Aurélio	Free Agent	Released	
December 2008	FW	99	(Argentina) / (Italy) Alejandro Delorte	Free Agent	Released	
January 2009	MF	6	(Greece) Konstantinos Nebegleras	(Greece) Atromitos	Released	
January 2009	GK	1	(Slovakia) Marián Kelemen	Free Agent	Released	

=== Loans in ===
Start date	End date	Position	No.	Player	From club	Fee	Ref.
September 2008	End of season	MF	24	(Spain) Víctor Vitolo	(Spain) Racing de Santander	None	

=== Loans out ===
Start date	End date	Position	No.	Player	To club	Fee	Ref.
January 2009	End of season	FW	14	(Spain) Felipe Sanchón	(Spain) Girona	None	

== Competitions ==
=== Overall ===
Competition	Started round	Current position / round	Final position / round	First match	Last match
Super League	Matchday 1	—	6th	31 August 2008	26 April 2009
Greek Cup	Fourth round	—	Fifth round	12 November 2008	28 January 2009
UEFA Cup	Second qualifying round	—	Second qualifying round	14 August 2008	28 August 2008

Updated to match played 26 April 2009
Source: Competitions

=== Overview ===
Competition	Record							
Competition	G	W	D	L	GF	GA	GD	Win %
Super League	30	13	8	9	30	31	−1	43.33
Greek Cup	3	1	2	0	2	1	+1	33.33
UEFA Cup	2	1	0	1	1	2	−1	50.00
Total	35	15	10	10	33	34	−1	42.86

Updated to match played 26 April 2009
Source: Competitions

=== Super League ===
==== Regular season ====
===== League table =====
Pos	Team	Pld	W	D	L	GF	GA	GD	Pts	Qualification or relegation
4	AEK Athens	30	14	13	3	40	24	+16	55	Qualification for the Play-offs
5	AEL	30	12	13	5	36	26	+10	49	Qualification for the Play-offs
6	Aris	30	13	8	9	30	31	−1	47	
7	Skoda Xanthi	30	9	11	10	25	21	+4	38	
8	Panionios	30	10	7	13	40	40	0	37	

Source: Super League Greece
Rules for classification: 1) Points; 2) Head-to-head points; 3) Head-to-head goal difference; 4) Play-offs (neutral ground).
(Note: Criterion 4 is only used if needed to decide champion, teams for relegation or teams for UEFA competitions).

===== Results summary =====
Overall								Home						Away					
Pld	W	D	L	GF	GA	GD	Pts	W	D	L	GF	GA	GD	W	D	L	GF	GA	GD
30	13	8	9	30	31	−1	47	8	5	2	19	9	+10	5	3	7	11	22	−11

Last updated: 26 April 2009.
Source: Super League

===== Matches =====
31 August 2008 1	Aris Thessaloniki	2 – 0	Levadiakos	Thessaloniki
17:00	Javito Peral 66'; Piotr Włodarczyk 78'	Report		Stadium: Kleanthis Vikelidis Stadium; Referee: Anastasios Kakos

14 September 2008 2	Ergotelis	3 – 0	Aris Thessaloniki	Heraklion
17:00	Mario Budimir 24'; Patrick Ogunsoto 31', 39'	Report		Stadium: Pankritio Stadium; Referee: Ilias Mazarakos

20 September 2008 3	Aris Thessaloniki	1 – 2	Panathinaikos	Thessaloniki
17:00	Javito Peral 10'	Report	Silva Cleyton 19'; Andreas Ivanschitz 26'	Stadium: Kleanthis Vikelidis Stadium; Referee: Georgios Daloukas

28 September 2008 4	PAOK	1 – 0	Aris Thessaloniki	Thessaloniki
19:15	Pablo Contreras 68'	Report		Stadium: Toumba Stadium; Referee: Lazaros Polatian

4 October 2008 5	Aris Thessaloniki	1 – 0	Iraklis	Thessaloniki
17:00	Alejandro Lembo 90'	Report		Stadium: Kleanthis Vikelidis Stadium; Referee: Dimitrios Kyrkos

18 October 2008 6	Panionios	2 – 1	Aris Thessaloniki	Athens
17:00	Giannis Maniatis 64'; Anderson Gonzaga 77'	Report	Javito Peral 2'	Stadium: Nea Smyrni Stadium; Referee: Michail Dakos

26 October 2008 7	Aris Thessaloniki	1 – 0	Olympiacos	Thessaloniki
17:00	Javito Peral 18'	Report		Stadium: Kleanthis Vikelidis Stadium; Referee: Vasileios Paboridis

1 November 2008 8	Aris Thessaloniki	0 – 0	AEL	Thessaloniki
17:00		Report		Stadium: Kleanthis Vikelidis Stadium; Referee: Michail Dakos

9 November 2008 9	Thrasyvoulos	1 – 2	Aris Thessaloniki	Athens
13:00	Stathis Rokas 48'	Report	Sergio Koke 66' (pen.); Mario Regueiro 84'	Stadium: Fyli Municipal Stadium; Referee: Michalis Germanakos

15 November 2008 10	Aris Thessaloniki	1 – 1	Asteras Tripolis	Thessaloniki
17:00	Sergio Koke 27'	Report	Lucio Filomeno 13'	Stadium: Kleanthis Vikelidis Stadium; Referee: Marios Labropoulos

23 November 2008 11	Skoda Xanthi	1 – 1	Aris Thessaloniki	Xanthi
17:00	Victor Agali 54'	Report	Toni Calvo 22'	Stadium: Xanthi FC Arena; Referee: Ilias Spathas

30 November 2008 12	Aris Thessaloniki	2 – 0	Panserraikos	Thessaloniki
13:00	Sergio Koke 80'; Mario Regueiro 90+4'	Report		Stadium: Kleanthis Vikelidis Stadium; Referee: Stavros Tritsonis

6 December 2008 13	OFI	0 – 1	Aris Thessaloniki	Heraklion
14:45		Report	Toni Calvo 90+1'	Stadium: Pankritio Stadium; Referee: Marios Labropoulos

14 December 2008 14	Aris Thessaloniki	1 – 1	AEK Athens	Thessaloniki
17:00	Toni Calvo 39'	Report	Edinho 71'	Stadium: Kleanthis Vikelidis Stadium; Referee: Georgios Daloukas

21 December 2008 15	Panthrakikos	0 – 0	Aris Thessaloniki	Komotini
13:00		Report		Stadium: Komotini Municipal Stadium; Referee: Michail Koukoulakis

4 January 2009 16	Levadiakos	2 – 0	Aris Thessaloniki	Livadeia
14:45	Leonardo 58', 72'	Report		Stadium: Levadia Municipal Stadium; Referee: Georgios Giannopoulos

11 January 2009 17	Aris Thessaloniki	0 – 0	Ergotelis	Thessaloniki
17:00		Report		Stadium: Kleanthis Vikelidis Stadium; Referee: Georgios Stathopoulos

18 January 2009 18	Panathinaikos	4 – 0	Aris Thessaloniki	Athens
17:00	Giorgos Karagounis 46' (pen.), 56'; Ante Rukavina 59'; Silva Cleyton 71'	Report		Stadium: Athens Olympic Stadium; Referee: Michail Dakos

25 January 2009 19	Aris Thessaloniki	0 – 0	PAOK	Thessaloniki
17:00		Report		Stadium: Kleanthis Vikelidis Stadium; Referee: Dimitrios Kyrkos

31 January 2009 20	Iraklis	0 – 1	Aris Thessaloniki	Thessaloniki
17:00		Report	Roberto Battión 78'	Stadium: Kaftanzoglio Stadium; Referee: Petros Konstantineas

7 February 2009 21	Aris Thessaloniki	1 – 0	Panionios	Thessaloniki
17:00	Sanel Jahić 78'	Report		Stadium: Kleanthis Vikelidis Stadium; Referee: Georgios Daloukas

14 February 2009 22	Olympiacos	2 – 1	Aris Thessaloniki	Piraeus
17:00	Predrag Đorđević 23'; Luciano Galletti 75'	Report	Vasilis Torosidis 90' (o.g.)	Stadium: Karaiskakis Stadium; Referee: Nathanail Charalabidis

22 February 2009 23	AEL	1 – 1	Aris Thessaloniki	Larissa
14:45	Maciej Żurawski 77'	Report	Sergio Koke 88'	Stadium: Alcazar Stadium; Referee: Vasileios Paboridis

28 February 2009 24	Aris Thessaloniki	2 – 1	Thrasyvoulos	Thessaloniki
17:00	Javier Cámpora 35' (pen.); Piotr Włodarczyk 90+1'	Report	Sakis Prittas 3' (o.g.)	Stadium: Kleanthis Vikelidis Stadium; Referee: Georgios Giannopoulos

7 March 2009 25	Asteras Tripolis	4 – 0	Aris Thessaloniki	Tripoli
14:45	Adrián Bastía 14'; Marcelão 55'; Vangelis Kaounos 78'; Horacio Cardozo 90+3'	Report		Stadium: Theodoros Kolokotronis Stadium; Referee: Ilias Mazarakos

14 March 2009 26	Aris Thessaloniki	0 – 1	Skoda Xanthi	Thessaloniki
17:00		Report	Victor Agali 80'	Stadium: Kleanthis Vikelidis Stadium; Referee: Anastasios Kakos

22 March 2009 27	Panserraikos	1 – 2	Aris Thessaloniki	Serres
18:00	Giorgos Georgiadis 3'	Report	Javier Cámpora 60'; Mario Regueiro 78'	Stadium: Serres Municipal Stadium; Referee: Georgios Daloukas

5 April 2009 28	Aris Thessaloniki	4 – 1	OFI	Thessaloniki
17:00	Javito Peral 11'; Frantz Bertin 57' (o.g.); Javier Cámpora 65'; Sanel Jahić 68'	Report	Stelios Sfakianakis 24'	Stadium: Kleanthis Vikelidis Stadium; Referee: Stavros Tritsonis

12 April 2009 29	AEK Athens	0 – 1	Aris Thessaloniki	Athens
17:00		Report	Sergio Koke 23'	Stadium: Athens Olympic Stadium; Referee: Anastasios Kakos

26 April 2009 30	Aris Thessaloniki	3 – 2	Panthrakikos	Thessaloniki
17:00	Sakis Prittas 63'; Javier Cámpora 90+2', 90+4'	Report	Sergio Ponce 28'; Xenofon Gittas 45+1'	Stadium: Kleanthis Vikelidis Stadium; Referee: Georgios Daloukas

=== Greek Football Cup ===
==== Fourth round ====
12 November 2008 Fourth round	Atromitos	1 – 2	Aris Thessaloniki	Athens
15:50	Michalis Kripintiris 88'	Report	Toni Calvo 55' (pen.); Javito Peral 80'	Stadium: Peristeri Stadium; Referee: Evangelos Katsidonis

==== Fifth round ====
14 January 2009 Fifth round	PAOK	0 – 0	Aris Thessaloniki	Thessaloniki
20:10		Report		Stadium: Toumba Stadium; Referee: Anastasios Kakos

==== Fifth round replay ====
28 January 2009 Fourth round	Aris Thessaloniki	0 – 0 (a.e.t.) (8 – 9 p)	PAOK	Thessaloniki
20:00		https://www.sport24.gr/football/aris-paok-0-0-8-9-pen.7802348.html (in Greek)		Stadium: Kleanthis Vikelidis Stadium; Referee: Vasilios Pamporidis
	Penalties
	Javier Cámpora (penalty scored); Toni Calvo (penalty scored); Roberto Battión (penalty scored); Víctor Vitolo (penalty missed); Alejandro Lembo (penalty scored); Sanel Jahić (penalty scored); Nacho García (penalty scored); Darcy Dolce Neto (penalty scored); Sergio Koke (penalty scored); Nikolaos Karabelas (penalty missed)		(penalty scored) Zlatan Muslimović; (penalty scored) Lino; (penalty scored) Joe Bizera; (penalty missed) Olivier Sorlin; (penalty scored) Ricardo Verón; (penalty scored) Marcos António; (penalty scored) Filippos Darlas; (penalty scored) Stelios Malezas; (penalty scored) Sotiris Balafas; (penalty scored) Stefanos Athanasiadis

=== UEFA Cup ===
==== Second qualifying round ====
14 August 2008 First leg	Aris Thessaloniki (Greece)	1 – 0	(Croatia) Slaven Koprivnica	Thessaloniki
20:00	Sergio Koke 55'	Report		Stadium: Kleanthis Vikelidis Stadium; Referee: Antonio Rubinos Pérez (Spain)

28 August 2008 Second leg	Slaven Koprivnica (Croatia)	2 – 0 (2–1 agg.)	(Greece) Aris Thessaloniki	Koprivnica
18:30	Bojan Vručina 14', 65'	Report		Stadium: Ivan Kušek-Apaš City Stadium; Referee: Martin Ingvarsson (Sweden)

== Squad statistics ==
=== Appearances ===
Players with no appearances not included in the list.

As of match played 26 April 2009

#	Position	Nat.	Player	Super League	Greek Cup	UEFA Cup	Total
2	DF	(Brazil)	Darcy Dolce Neto	27	3	2	32
3	DF	(Greece)	Efthymis Kouloucheris	4	0	0	4
4	DF	(Uruguay) / (Italy)	Alejandro Lembo	19	3	1	23
5	DF	(Brazil) / (Portugal)	Ronaldo Guiaro	12	1	1	14
7	FW	(Spain)	Toni Calvo	25	2	2	29
8	MF	(Bolivia)	Nacho García	24	3	2	29
9	MF	(Brazil) / (Italy)	Thiago Gentil	16	0	2	18
10	FW	(Spain)	Sergio Koke	27	3	2	32
11	MF	(Brazil)	Diogo Siston	13	2	0	15
12	FW	(Uruguay) / (Spain)	Mario Regueiro	23	3	2	28
13	GK	(Greece)	Michalis Sifakis	24	3	0	27
15	DF	(Greece)	Nikos Karabelas	19	3	0	22
17	FW	(Poland)	Piotr Włodarczyk	18	1	1	20
18	FW	(Argentina)	Javier Cámpora	9	1	0	10
19	FW	(Greece)	Thanasis Papazoglou	2	0	0	2
20	FW	(Spain)	Javito Peral	29	3	2	34
21	DF	(France)	Valentin Roberge	20	1	0	21
24	MF	(Spain)	Víctor Vitolo	21	3	0	24
26	DF	(Bosnia and Herzegovina) / (France)	Sanel Jahić	16	2	2	20
29	MF	(Greece)	Sakis Prittas	7	1	1	9
30	MF	(Argentina)	Roberto Battión	20	2	1	23
31	GK	(Greece)	Dimitrios Karatziovalis	2	0	0	2
32	DF	(Albania)	Kristi Vangjeli	8	0	2	10
33	FW	(Greece)	Stavros Labriakos	7	2	0	9
Players who left the club during this season
	DF	(Brazil) / (Portugal)	Marco Aurélio	4	0	2	6
	FW	(Argentina) / (Italy)	Alejandro Delorte	4	0	0	4
	FW	(Spain)	Felipe Sanchón	4	0	1	5
	MF	(Greece)	Konstantinos Nebegleras	8	0	0	8
	GK	(Slovakia)	Marián Kelemen	5	0	2	7
Total				30	3	2	35

=== Goals ===
As of match played 26 April 2009

Ranking	Position	Nat.	Player	Super League	Greek Cup	UEFA	Total
1	FW	(Spain)	Sergio Koke	5	0	1	6
1	FW	(Spain)	Javito Peral	5	1	0	6
3	FW	(Argentina)	Javier Cámpora	5	0	0	5
4	FW	(Spain)	Toni Calvo	3	1	0	4
5	FW	(Uruguay) / (Spain)	Mario Regueiro	3	0	0	3
6	FW	(Poland)	Piotr Włodarczyk	2	0	0	2
6	DF	(Bosnia and Herzegovina) / (France)	Sanel Jahić	2	0	0	2
8	MF	(Argentina)	Roberto Battión	1	0	0	1
8	DF	(Uruguay) / (Italy)	Alejandro Lembo	1	0	0	1
8	MF	(Greece)	Sakis Prittas	1	0	0	1
Own Goals				2	0	0	2
Total				30	2	1	33

=== Clean sheets ===
If a goalkeeper was substituted and he did not conceded a goal while he was in the game but the team conceded a goal after him, the goalkeeper would not claim the clean sheet.

As of match played 26 April 2009

#	Nat.	Player	Super League	Greek Cup	UEFA Cup	Total
13	(Greece)	Michalis Sifakis	10	2	0	12
	(Slovakia)	Marián Kelemen	2	0	1	3
Total			12	2	1	15
