= Domoraud =

Domoraud is a West African surname. Notable people with the surname include:

- Cyril Domoraud (born 1971), Ivorian footballer
- Gilles Domoraud (born 1979), Ivorian footballer
- Jean-Jacques Domoraud (born 1981), French footballer
- Wilfried Domoraud (born 1988), Ivorian footballer
