= Avraam Papadopoulos =

Greek footballer

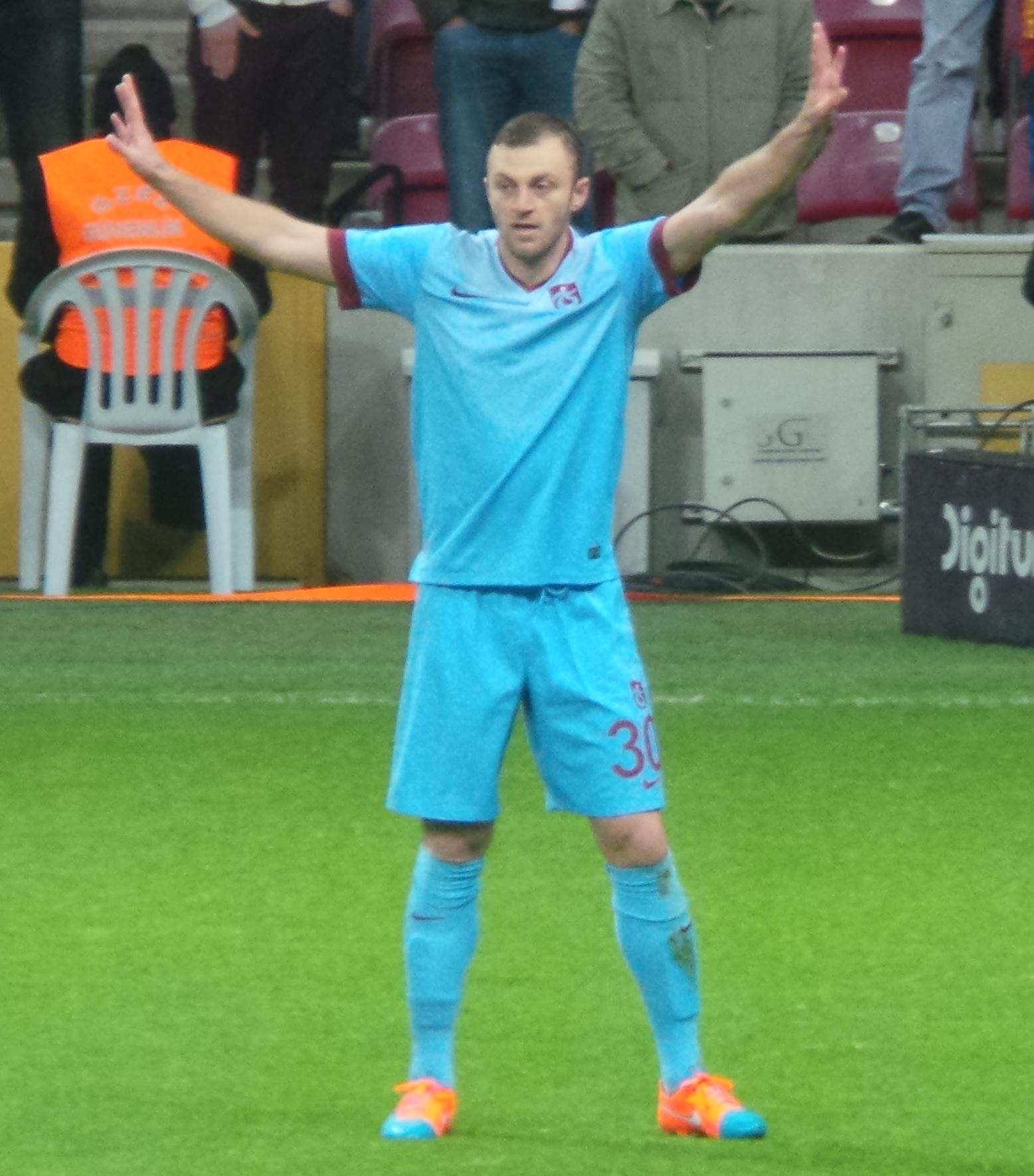
- Avraam in action for Trabzonspor

Personal information
- Date of birth: 3 December 1984 (age 41)
- Place of birth: Melbourne, Victoria, Australia
- Height: 1.88 m (6 ft 2 in)
- Position: Centre-back

Senior career*
Years	Team	Apps	(Gls)
2003–2008	Aris	119	(13)
2008–2014	Olympiacos	124	(5)
2014–2015	Trabzonspor	5	(0)
2015–2016	Shanghai Shenhua	23	(1)
2016	Júbilo Iwata	13	(1)
2017–2019	Brisbane Roar	31	(4)
2019–2022	Olympiacos	27	(0)
Total		342	(24)

International career
2008–2014	Greece	37	(0)
- * Club domestic league appearances and goals

Avraam Papadopoulos (Greek: Αβραάμ Παπαδόπουλος; born 3 December 1984) is a Greek former professional footballer who played as a centre-back. He was born in Melbourne, Australia, to Greek parents.

== Club career ==
=== Aris ===
Papadopoulos started his professional career with Aris in 2003 after stepping up from the Aris Youth with another promising attacking youngster, his friend Ethimios Pantelidis. Before, he had been with Digenis Lakkomatos Chalkidiki youth.

At the beginning of his career, he started as a striker or attacking midfielder. In the period between 2003 and summer 2006, Aris lived some darker days of their history in Greek football also tangled with a defensive philosophy of football, financial problems in the club, Papadopoulos experienced some gradual "demotions" into the more defensive positions by his coaches. Firstly into defensive midfielder, then also right back and finally central defender.

A physical defender, Papadopoulos is recognized for his tackling ability and aerial presence, though his aggressive style has resulted in numerous yellow cards. Throughout his career, he has scored multiple goals via headers and penalties, and he is occasionally utilized as a forward late in matches. A notable moment in his career occurred during the UEFA Cup qualifiers, where his header against Zaragoza at the Kleanthis Vikelidis stadium ensured Aris advanced to the group stage.

Known as the "Aris kid", he was one of the most popular players amongst the fans. He was also considered one of the "last Mohicans" in the club ("Mohicans"- figuratively related to the players as Giorgios Koltsidas, Kostas Nebegleras, Papadopoulos, Georgios Gougoulias, Ronald Nacho Garcia, Efthimios Kouloucheris, Kristi Vangjeli, Petros Passalis, Spyros Gogolos, that were with this team in the second division, season 2005/06, as well as the season's after that, when the club experienced its promotion and then a total rebirth in the first division with good football and higher standing positions). Papadopoulos was also known for his passion. For many years' transfer windows he used to be linked to Athenian giants (especially Olympiacos) by media/usually the sports news-papers, but yet had never changed his club, by then. Also as stories were circulating during the season (2006/07), he had been watched closely by some bigger clubs' scouts like Benfica or Chelsea, and Zenit of Russia as well. In last season of his residence in Thessaloniki before moving into Piraeus, he was considered one of the Aris top stars along with Sergio Koke, Ronald Nacho Garcia and experienced ex-super star and big Marcio Amoroso.

At the end of the 2007–08 season, after three offers, he refused to renew his contract up to 2013, although he had previously expressed a likelihood to renew. That act, which took its culmination right after he accepted to join Olympiacos, caused many Aris fans to rage at him pronouncing the same as a traitor to them.

=== Olympiacos ===
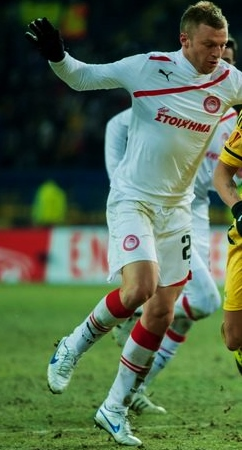
Papadopoulos with Olympiacos in 2012

On 4 July 2008 the player was transferred to Olympiacos for 2.5 million euros on a four-year contract. Avraam stated this during a press conference, "I came to Olympiacos, and not Panathinaikos, because it was the best choice for me. The ideal choice. I would not like to say anything else and it does not make sense to talk about the past. I will work as hard as I can to make the team reach its goals and objectives in both Europe and Greece".

Papadopoulos made his debut against Anorthosis Famagusta FC in a 3–0 away loss. He finished 2008–09 season with 22 league matches. He started the next season by scoring against ŠK Slovan Bratislava in a 0–2 away win. This was his first goal for Olympiacos. He managed to score a crucial goal against PAOK in a 1–2 away win. He also scored against AEK Athens F.C. in a 1–2 home loss. He completed 28 league appearances and he scored 2 goals. His partnership with Olof Mellberg at the centre of defence played a vital role for Olympiacos as they won back-to-back championships in the 2010–11 and 2011–12 seasons.

On 24 June 2011 he was accused by the Athens prosecutor for his alleged involvement in match-fixing, as the list of those implicated in the scandal that has rocked Greek football grew. Papadopoulos, who played for champions Olympiacos, was also included in the list along with another high-profile player, Kostas Mendrinos, who is on the books of Aris. Finally, he was acquitted by these allegations by the Five Member Court of Appeal of Athens.

Following his injury in the Euro 2012 tournament, it was revealed that Papadopoulos had torn his ACL. After an eight-month absence, Papadopoulos returned to play by entering as a substitute for Kostas Manolas on the 46th minute of a 1–0 victory over Kavala on 30 January 2013. On 10 March 2013 he managed to score 2 goals against AEK Athens F.C. in a 3–0 home win. With that win Olympiacos claimed the 40th champion in his history. He also scored in the final match of the season, against Panionios in a 2–1 home win after an assist of Ariel Ibagaza.

Papadopoulos' injury issues were a constant companion during the 2013/14 season. That year, the club's captain was mired by various mishaps, but even so, he managed to show off what "metal" is made of.

=== Trabzonspor ===
Avraam Papadopoulos took a swipe at coach Michel after sealing a free transfer to Trabzonspor. The 29-year-old was club captain for the Greek champions and had been a pivotal figure since joining in 2008. However, his last season saw Dimitris Siovas break into the first-team and Papadopoulos became a somewhat peripheral figure at the Karaiskakis Stadium. The Greece international took the time to praise Olympiacos president Evangelos Marinakis, but revealed that his relationship with Spanish coach Michel was beyond repair after completing his move to Turkey. "I want to thank wholeheartedly the president of Olympiacos, Mr Marinakis, and the management who respected my desire, despite strong disagreement, to leave the club for a new challenge," said Papadopoulos in an open letter on the club's official website.

On 1 September 2014 Trabzonspor landed the former Greek international from Olympiacos. Papadopoulos was set to be the center of fans attention, with the veteran midfielder becoming only the second Greek player to play in Turkey's top-flight, following Theofanis Gekas.

=== Shanghai Shenhua ===
On 23 January 2015 Trabzonspor transferred Papadopoulos to Shanghai Shenhua for €285,000, he signed a contract until 30 December 2016. He became the first ever Greek footballer to play in the Chinese Super League. On 15 August 2015, in an away 2–2 draw against the champions Guangzhou Evergrande, he managed to score the second goal, helping his club to avoid defeat. On 20 February 2016, due to the reorganization of the team and the acquisitions of Demba Ba and Obafemi Martins in combination with the limitation of foreign players, forced the Greek international to dissolve his contract with the club. On 23 February 2016 it was rumoured that Atromitos were interested in signing the central defender who was recently released by Shanghai Greenland Shenhua.

=== Júbilo Iwata ===
On 18 May 2016 Papadopoulos continued his career at J1 League club Júbilo Iwata, for an undisclosed fee. He became the first Greek footballer to play in the J1 League. On 18 June 2016 he made his debut with the club in a 1–0 away loss against Shonan Bellmare. On 24 August 2016, he scored his first goal with the club, sealing a 3–2 away win against rivals Avispa Fukuoka. On 5 November 2016, after six months, they mutually terminated their contract.

=== Brisbane Roar ===
On 14 February 2017 Papadopoulos joined Australian A-League club Brisbane Roar until the end of the season, as an injury replacement for Daniel Bowles, who was sidelined for at least 10 months with a serious knee injury. Despite representing Greece, the central defender has an Australian passport and is therefore not counted as a visa player. On 5 March 2017 he made his debut with the club in a 3–1 away win against Newcastle Jets. On 22 June 2017, the club has retained the ex-international defender's services for another 12 months after his midseason arrival early this year. Melbourne-born Papadopoulos played seven games at centre-back during the semi-finalists' 2016–17 season, providing cover for Luke De Vere and Jade North.

On 28 October 2017, Wellingthon's keeper Smith failed to properly deal with a Fahid Ben Khalfallah free-kick, with defender Papadopoulos taking the rebound on the spot to score his first A-League goal, in a 3–3 away draw. On 17 November 2017, Papadopoulos scored the opener and the clincher for the Brisbane Roar as they climbed off the bottom of the ladder in a 3–1 home win game against Melbourne City FC. He could have had a hat-trick from another goal-bound header before half-time but Stefan Mauk managed to clear it off the line. On 25 November 2017, in the last quarter of the game, Papadopoulos spat at Sydney FC striker Matt Simon, who retaliated, Avraam went to ground covering his face, resulting in Matt Simon's dismissal. The incident saw the Roar make a statement shortly after the game panning the actions of Avraam that marred the club's 3–1 A-League loss, against Sydney FC. On 8 December 2017, Papadopoulos was given a seven-match ban by the A-League judiciary for spitting on Sydney FC's Matt Simon. The defender's ban included the one match he had already served, when he sat out the Roar's 2–0 win over Western Sydney Wanderers FC.

On 12 January 2018, he returned to the squad in a 1–0 away loss against Newcastle Jets FC. A week later, Papadopoulos scored, he put the hosts ahead and kept their slim A-League finals hopes alive with a 3–2 win over fellow battlers Perth Glory.

On 6 March 2018, he suffered a very serious left ankle injury during team training. He underwent surgery in Brisbane and was out of action for four months. On 27 January 2019, Papadopoulos is reportedly close to sealing a fairytale return to Greek giants Olympiacos. The 34 year old has not played in the A-League since matchday 9, through an ankle injury and may not play for Brisbane again if reports are to be believed.

=== Return to Olympiacos ===
On 28 January 2019, Olympiacos revealed that veteran defender Avraam Papadopoulos has returned to the club for a six-month contract. On 17 July 2022 Olympiacos renewned the contract with Papadopoulos for another 3 years.

=== Retirement ===
On 1 August 2022, Papadopoulos officially announced his retirement from professional football.

== International career ==
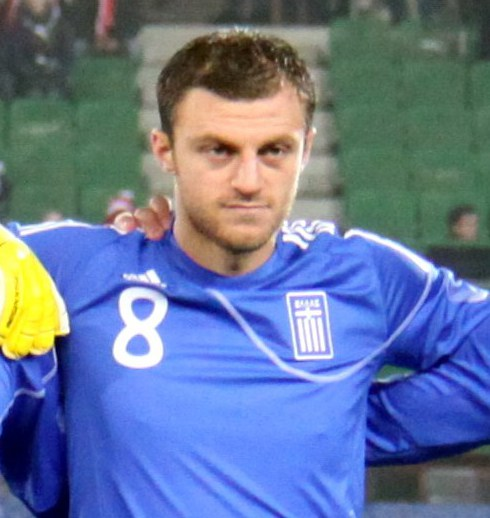
Papadopoulos with Greece in 2010

Papadopoulos had been capped for Greece U-21 for several times. After impressing Greece coach Otto Rehhagel, He was called to the national team for the first time on 1 February 2008 and made his debut in the win over the Czech Republic on 5 February.

In 2010, Papadopoulos played for Greece at the 2010 World Cup. He was later a regular squad member of Greece as they went unbeaten through qualifying for Euro 2012. In the finals, however, Papadopoulos was injured in the opening game against Poland and missed the rest of the tournament.

He made his come back with the national squad on 23 March 2013, during the World Cup 2014 qualification game in Bosnia/Herzegovina (lost 3–1). Since the end of the qualifying rounds he has not appeared in the team managed by Fernando Santos. Avraam was called from Greece national team manager Fernando Santos to the 30 man provisional World Cup squad, but he did not make it to be the final 23-man squad for 2014 FIFA World Cup.

== Style of play ==
Papadopoulos plays as a centre-back. After suffering a knee injury in 2012, he adapted his playing style to rely more on positioning and experience.

== Career statistics ==
As of 23 January 2022

Club	Season	League			National Cup		Continental		Other		Total	
Club	Season	Division	Apps	Goals	Apps	Goals	Apps	Goals	Apps	Goals	Apps	Goals
Aris	2002–03	Alpha Ethniki	0	0	1	0	–		–		1	0
Aris	2003–04	Alpha Ethniki	18	0	3	0	1	0	–		22	0
Aris	2004–05	Alpha Ethniki	26	3	8	2	–		–		34	5
Aris	2005–06	Beta Ethniki	25	7	4	0	2	0	–		31	7
Aris	2006–07	Super League Greece	23	2	1	0	–		–		24	2
Aris	2007–08	Super League Greece	27	1	7	0	6	1	3	0	43	2
Aris	Total		119	13	24	2	9	1	3	0	155	15
Olympiacos	2008–09	Super League Greece	22	0	6	0	9	0	–		37	0
Olympiacos	2009–10	Super League Greece	25	2	1	0	11 (Note: Appearances in UEFA Champions League)	1	5	0	42	3
Olympiacos	2010–11	Super League Greece	26	0	3	0	1 (Note: Appearance in UEFA Europa League)	0	–		30	0
Olympiacos	2011–12	Super League Greece	22	0	5	0	8 (Note: Five appearances in UEFA Champions League, three appearances in UEFA Europa League)	0	–		35	0
Olympiacos	2012–13	Super League Greece	5	3	2	0	0	0	–		7	3
Olympiacos	2013–14	Super League Greece	20	0	4	0	0	0	–		24	0
Olympiacos	2014–15	Super League Greece	1	0	0	0	0	0	–		1	0
Olympiacos	Total		121	5	21	0	29	1	5	0	176	6
Trabzonspor	2014–15	Süper Lig	5	0	0	0	5 (Note: Appearances in UEFA Europa League)	1	–		10	1
Shanghai Shenhua	2015	Chinese Super League	23	1	1	0	0	0	–		24	1
Júbilo Iwata	2016	J1 League	13	1	1	0	0	0	–		14	1
Brisbane Roar FC	2016–17	A-League	7	0	0	0	3 (Note: Appearances in AFC Champions League)	0	–		10	0
Brisbane Roar FC	2017–18	A-League	15	4	0	0	4	0	–		19	4
Brisbane Roar FC	2018–19	A-League	9	0	0	0	0	0	–		9	0
Brisbane Roar FC	Total		31	4	0	0	7	0	0	0	38	4
Olympiacos	2018–19	Super League Greece	2	0	0	0	0	0	–		2	0
Olympiacos	2019–20	Super League Greece	12	0	2	0	2 (Note: One appearance in UEFA Champions League, one appearance in UEFA Europa League)	0	–		16	0
Olympiacos	2020–21	Super League Greece	5	0	2	0	0	0	–		7	0
Olympiacos	2021–22	Super League Greece	8	0	3	0	0	0	–		11	0
Olympiacos	Total		27	0	7	0	2	0	–		36	0
Career total			339	24	54	2	52	3	8	0	453	28

== Honours ==
Aris

- Greek Cup runner-up: 2004–05, 2007–08

Olympiacos

- Super League Greece: 2008–09, 2010–11, 2011–12, 2012–13, 2013–14, 2019–20, 2020–21, 2021–22
- Greek Cup: 2008–09, 2011–12, 2012–13, 2019–20; runner-up: 2020–21

Individual

- Super League Greece Greek Footballer of the Year: 2010–11
- List of 18 Top Players of Super League Greece: 2009–10, 2010–11, 2011–12
