= Sergio Ponce =

Sergio Ponce may refer to:

- Sergio Ponce (Mexican footballer) (born 1981), Mexican football midfielder
- Sergio Ponce (Argentine footballer) (born 1984), Argentine football winger
