= Valentin Roberge =

Cypriot footballer (born 1987)

Personal information
- Full name: Valentin Sébastien Roger Roberge
- Date of birth: 9 June 1987 (age 39)
- Place of birth: Montreuil, France
- Height: 1.85 m (6 ft 1 in)
- Position: Centre-back

Youth career
- ESD Montreuil
- Les Lilas
- Paris FC

Senior career*
Years	Team	Apps	(Gls)
2006–2007	Guingamp B	28	(1)
2007–2008	Paris SG B	31	(0)
2008–2010	Aris	25	(0)
2010–2013	Marítimo	77	(2)
2013–2016	Sunderland	10	(0)
2014–2015	→ Reims (loan)	11	(0)
2016–2023	Apollon Limassol	168	(4)
2023–2026	AEK Larnaca	82	(0)

International career
2022–2023	Cyprus	5	(1)
- * Club domestic league appearances and goals as of 10:07, 27 May 2026 (UTC)

Valentin Sébastien Roger Roberge (born 9 June 1987) is a professional footballer who plays as a centre-back.

Born in France, he represented Cyprus at international level.

== Club career ==
=== Early career ===
Born in Montreuil, Seine-Saint-Denis, Roberge had spells with hometown's ESD Montreuil, Les Lilas and Paris FC. He joined Guingamp for his senior debut, but went on to appear solely for the reserve side.

For the 2007–08 season, Roberge signed with Paris Saint Germain, but met the exact same fate.

=== Aris and Marítimo ===
In the summer of 2008, Roberge joined Aris Thessaloniki on a three-year deal. He made his debut against Panathinaikos but, midway through his second year in the Super League Greece, an economic crisis took hold of the club, and he went five months without being paid before his contract was terminated.

Following his release, Roberge moved to Portugal's Marítimo after a successful trial. He started in all of his 25 Primeira Liga appearances in the 2011–12 campaign, helping the Madeirans to finish fifth and qualify for the UEFA Europa League.

=== Sunderland ===
On 10 June 2013, Premier League side Sunderland announced the signing of Roberge on a free transfer. He made his debut on 17 August in a 0–1 home defeat against Fulham, and scored his only goal on 24 September in the 2–0 home win over Peterborough in the League Cup, heading in an Adam Johnson cross.

Roberge left the Stadium of Light in June 2016, with 13 competitive matches to his credit. Before that, he served a season-long loan at Reims.

=== Apollon Limassol ===
Roberge signed for Apollon Limassol in the 2016 off-season. He won several accolades during his tenure, including the Cypriot First Division in 2021–22.

== International career ==
In September 2022, Roberge became a Cypriot citizen. He won his first cap for the national team on the 24th at the age of 35, in a 1–0 victory against Greece in the UEFA Nations League. He scored his first goal three days later, but in a 5–1 loss in Kosovo in the same competition.

== Career statistics ==
As of 7 July 2025

Club	Season	League			National cup		League cup		Continental		Other		Total	
Club	Season	Division	Apps	Goals	Apps	Goals	Apps	Goals	Apps	Goals	Apps	Goals	Apps	Goals
Aris	2008–09	Super League Greece	20	0	1	0	—		0	0	—		21	0
Aris	2009–10	Super League Greece	5	0	1	0	—		—		—		6	0
Aris	Total		25	0	2	0	—		0	0	—		27	0
Marítimo	2010–11	Primeira Liga	25	1	2	0	1	0	0	0	—		28	1
Marítimo	2011–12	Primeira Liga	25	0	3	0	5	0	—		—		33	0
Marítimo	2012–13	Primeira Liga	27	1	1	0	0	0	9	1	—		37	2
Marítimo	Total		77	2	6	0	6	0	9	1	—		98	3
Sunderland	2013–14	Premier League	9	0	1	0	2	1	—		—		12	1
Sunderland	2014–15	Premier League	1	0	—		0	0	—		—		1	0
Sunderland	2015–16	Premier League	0	0	0	0	0	0	—		—		0	0
Sunderland	Total		10	0	1	0	2	1	—		—		13	1
Reims (loan)	2014–15	Ligue 1	11	0	1	0	1	0	—		—		13	0
Apollon Limassol	2016–17	Cypriot First Division	25	0	7	0	—		0	0	1 (Note: Appearance in Cypriot Super Cup)	0	33	0
Apollon Limassol	2017–18	Cypriot First Division	34	1	4	0	—		10	0	1	0	49	1
Apollon Limassol	2018–19	Cypriot First Division	25	2	3	0	—		13	0	—		41	2
Apollon Limassol	2019–20	Cypriot First Division	2	0	0	0	—		0	0	—		2	0
Apollon Limassol	2020–21	Cypriot First Division	27	0	1	0	—		3	0	—		31	0
Apollon Limassol	2021–22	Cypriot First Division	29	0	2	0	—		—		—		31	0
Apollon Limassol	2022–23	Cypriot First Division	25	1	1	0	—		8	1	1	0	35	3
Apollon Limassol	Total		167	4	18	0	—		34	1	3	0	222	6
AEK Larnaca	2023–24	Cypriot First Division	31	0	1	0	—		2	0	—		34	0
AEK Larnaca	2024–25	Cypriot First Division	25	0	4	0	—		2	0	—		31	0
AEK Larnaca	Total		56	0	5	0	—		4	0	0	0	65	0
Career total			346	6	33	0	9	1	47	2	3	0	438	10

== Honours ==
Apollon Limassol

- Cypriot First Division: 2021–22
- Cypriot Cup: 2016–17; runner-up: 2017–18
- Cypriot Super Cup: 2016, 2017, 2022

AEK Larnaca

- Cypriot Cup: 2024–25
