= 2013–14 Sunderland A.F.C. season =

English football club season

Sunderland
2013–14 season
- Chairman: Ellis Short
- Manager: Paolo Di Canio (until 22 September 2013); Kevin Ball (caretaker, until 8 October 2013); Gus Poyet (from 8 October 2013)
- Stadium: Stadium of Light
- Premier League: 14th
- FA Cup: Sixth round
- League Cup: Runners-up
- Top goalscorer: League: Adam Johnson (8); All: Adam Johnson (10); Fabio Borini (10)
- Highest home attendance: 46,313 (27 October vs Newcastle United, Premier League)
- Lowest home attendance: 15,966 (6 November vs Southampton, League Cup)
Home colours	Away colours

The 2013–14 season is Sunderland's seventh consecutive season in the top division of English football, the Premier League.

== Squad & coaching staff ==
=== Current squad ===
As of 31 January 2014.

Note: Flags indicate national team as defined under FIFA eligibility rules; some limited exceptions apply. Players may hold more than one non-FIFA nationality.

No.	Pos.	Nation	Player
2	DF	SCO	Phil Bardsley
3	DF	ITA	Andrea Dossena
4	MF	KOR	Ki Sung-yueng (on loan from Swansea City)
5	DF	ENG	Wes Brown
7	MF	SWE	Sebastian Larsson
8	MF	ENG	Craig Gardner
9	FW	SCO	Steven Fletcher
10	FW	ENG	Connor Wickham
11	MF	ENG	Adam Johnson
12	DF	CZE	Ondřej Čelůstka (on loan from Trabzonspor)
13	GK	ENG	Jordan Pickford
14	MF	ENG	Jack Colback
16	DF	IRL	John O'Shea (captain)
17	FW	USA	Jozy Altidore

No.	Pos.	Nation	Player
20	GK	IRL	Keiren Westwood
22	MF	MTN	El Hadji Ba
23	MF	ITA	Emanuele Giaccherini
24	DF	ESP	Carlos Cuéllar
25	GK	ITA	Vito Mannone
26	MF	SCO	Liam Bridcutt
27	DF	ARG	Santiago Vergini (on loan from Estudiantes La Plata)
28	DF	ESP	Marcos Alonso (on loan from Fiorentina)
29	DF	FRA	Valentin Roberge
30	FW	ARG	Ignacio Scocco
31	FW	ITA	Fabio Borini (on loan from Liverpool)
32	GK	ARG	Oscar Ustari
33	MF	ENG	Lee Cattermole
35	MF	GRE	Charis Mavrias

==== Out on loan ====
Note: Flags indicate national team as defined under FIFA eligibility rules; some limited exceptions apply. Players may hold more than one non-FIFA nationality.

No.	Pos.	Nation	Player
6	MF	CPV	Cabral (at Genoa until 30 June 2014)
15	MF	WAL	David Vaughan (at Nottingham Forest until 30 June 2014)
21	DF	FRA	Modibo Diakité (at Fiorentina until 30 June 2014)
19	MF	SWE	David Moberg Karlsson (at Kilmarnock until 30 June 2014)

No.	Pos.	Nation	Player
41	FW	ENG	Duncan Watmore (at Hibernian until 30 June 2014)
—	FW	ENG	Danny Graham (at Middlesbrough until 30 June 2014)
—	MF	SEN	Alfred N'Diaye (at Real Betis until 30 June 2014)

== Backroom staff ==
Position	Name
Head Coach	Gus Poyet
Assistant Head Coach	Mauricio Taricco
First Team Coach	Charlie Oatway
Goalkeeping Coach	Andy Beasley
Fitness Coach	Antonio Pintus
Chief Scout	Valentino Angeloni
Academy Manager	Ged McNamee
Youth Team Coach	Robbie Stockdale
Senior Professional Development Coach	Kevin Ball
Head of Coaching	Elliott Dickman
Senior Physiotherapist	Peter Brand
Kit Manager	John Cooke

Source: Sunderland A.F.C.

== Transfers ==
=== In ===
Date	Pos.	Name	From	Fee
24 May 2013	FW	(England) Duncan Watmore	(England) Altrincham	Undisclosed
19 June 2013	FW	(Sweden) David Moberg Karlsson	(Sweden) IFK Göteborg	£1.5 million
1 July 2013	DF	(France) Modibo Diakité	(Italy) Lazio	Free
1 July 2013	DF	(France) Valentin Roberge	(Portugal) Marítimo	Free
1 July 2013	MF	(Cape Verde) Cabral	(Switzerland) Basel	Free
2 July 2013	GK	(Italy) Vito Mannone	(England) Arsenal	£2,000,000
8 July 2013	ST	(United States) Jozy Altidore	(Netherlands) AZ	£6,000,000
10 July 2013	MF	(France) El Hadji Ba	(France) Le Havre	£300,000
16 July 2013	MF	(Italy) Emanuele Giaccherini	(Italy) Juventus	£6,500,000
12 August 2013	DF	(Czech Republic) Ondřej Čelůstka	(Turkey) Trabzonspor	Loan
22 August 2013	MF	(Greece) Charis Mavrias	(Greece) Panathinaikos	£3,000,000
31 August 2013	MF	(South Korea) Ki Sung-yueng	(Wales) Swansea City	Loan
2 September 2013	FW	(Italy) Fabio Borini	(England) Liverpool	Loan
2 September 2013	DF	(Italy) Andrea Dossena	(Italy) Napoli	Free
1 January 2014	DF	(Spain) Marcos Alonso	(Italy) Fiorentina	Loan
20 January 2014	DF	(Argentina) Santiago Vergini	(Argentina) Estudiantes La Plata	Loan
21 January 2014	GK	(Argentina) Oscar Ustari	(Spain) Almería	Free
30 January 2014	FW	(Argentina) Ignacio Scocco	(Brazil) Internacional	Undisclosed
31 January 2014	MF	(Scotland) Liam Bridcutt	(England) Brighton & Hove Albion	Undisclosed

=== Out ===
Date	Pos.	No.	Name	To	Fee
28 May 2013	GK		(England) Ben Wilson	(England) Cambridge United	Free
28 May 2013	DF	19	(England) Titus Bramble	Released	
28 May 2013	DF	12	(England) Matthew Kilgallon	(England) Blackburn Rovers	Free
28 May 2013	MF		(England) Adam Reed	(England) Burton Albion	Free
28 May 2013	FW	33	(England) Ryan Noble	(England) Burnley	Free
25 June 2013	GK	22	(Belgium) Simon Mignolet	(England) Liverpool	£9,000,000
28 June 2013	MF	27	(Egypt) Ahmed Elmohamady	(England) Hull City	£2,000,000
19 July 2013	FW	9	(England) Danny Graham	(England) Hull City	Loan
28 July 2013	MF	4	(Senegal) Alfred N'Diaye	(Turkey) Eskişehirspor	Loan
2 August 2013	GK	13	(England) Jordan Pickford	(England) Burton Albion	Loan
8 August 2013	MF	23	(Republic of Ireland) James McClean	(England) Wigan Athletic	£1,500,000
20 August 2013	MF	34	(England) Billy Knott	(England) Wycombe Wanderers	Loan
2 September 2013	FW	28	(Benin) Stéphane Sessègnon	(England) West Bromwich Albion	£5,500,000
6 January 2014	FW	18	(France) Mikael Mandron	(England) Fleetwood Town	Loan
9 January 2014	MF	6	(Switzerland) Cabral	(Italy) Genoa	Loan
16 January 2014	FW	17	(South Korea) Ji Dong-won	(Germany) FC Augsburg	Undisclosed
30 January 2014	MF		(Senegal) Alfred N'Diaye	(Spain) Real Betis	Loan
31 January 2014	DF	21	(France) Modibo Diakité	(Italy) Fiorentina	Loan
31 January 2014	FW	41	(England) Duncan Watmore	(Scotland) Hibernian	Loan
31 January 2014	MF	19	(Sweden) David Moberg Karlsson	(Scotland) Kilmarnock	Loan
31 January 2014	FW		(England) Danny Graham	(England) Middlesbrough	Loan

== Pre-season and friendlies ==
=== Friendlies ===
Date	Opponents	H / A	Result H – A	Scorers
10 July 2013	(Italy) Local Select XI	A	1–13	Sessègnon x5, Karlsson x2, Ji, Larsson, Roberge, Altidore, Graham, Mandron
17 July 2013	FC Chiasso	N	1–0	Wickham
7 August 2013	Midtjylland	A	0–1	Johnson

== Barclays Asia Trophy ==
Semi-finals
24 July – Hong Kong
South China	0
Manchester City	1
24 July – Hong Kong
Tottenham Hotspur	1
Sunderland	3

Final
27 July – Hong Kong
Manchester City	1
Sunderland	0
Third place
27 July – Hong Kong
South China	0
Tottenham Hotspur	6

=== Semifinals ===
All kick-off times are local (UTC+08:00).

24 July 2013
18:30

Tottenham Hotspur (England)	1–3	(England) Sunderland
Sigurðsson 28'	Report	Cabral 33'; Brown 64'; Karlsson 80'

Hong Kong Stadium, So Kon Po
Attendance: 35,950
Referee: Liu Kwok Man (Hong Kong)

Delayed by 30 minutes due to rain. Game reduced to 80 minutes (40-minute halves).

24 July 2013
20:40

South China (Hong Kong)	0–1	(England) Manchester City
	Report	Džeko 21'

Hong Kong Stadium, So Kon Po
Attendance: 35,950
Referee: Anthony Taylor (England)

Delayed by 10 minutes due to rain. Game reduced to 80 minutes (40-minute halves).

=== Third-place playoff ===
27 July 2013
18:00

Tottenham Hotspur (England)	6–0	(Hong Kong) South China
Tse 12' (o.g.); Dempsey 34'; Defoe 45', 54', 80'; Townsend 86'	Report

Hong Kong Stadium, So Kon Po
Attendance: 39,544
Referee: Neil Swarbrick (England)

=== Final ===
27 July 2013
20:30

Manchester City (England)	1–0	(England) Sunderland
Džeko 9'	Report

Hong Kong Stadium, So Kon Po
Attendance: 39,544
Referee: Anthony Taylor (England)

== Competitions ==
=== Overall ===
Competition	Started round	Current position / round	Final position / round	First match	Last match
Premier League	—	—	14th	17 August 2013	11 May 2014
League Cup	2nd round	—	Runners-up	28 August 2013	2 March 2014
FA Cup	3rd round	—	6th round	4 January 2014	9 March 2014

Updated to match played 11 May 2014
Source: Competitions

=== Premier League ===
==== League table ====
Pos	Team	Pld	W	D	L	GF	GA	GD	Pts	Qualification or relegation
12	Swansea City	38	11	9	18	54	54	0	42	
13	West Ham United	38	11	7	20	40	51	−11	40	
14	Sunderland	38	10	8	20	41	60	−19	38	
15	Aston Villa	38	10	8	20	39	61	−22	38	
16	Hull City	38	10	7	21	38	53	−15	37	Qualification for the Europa League third qualifying round (Note: Hull City qualified for the Europa League third qualifying round as runners-up of the 2013–14 FA Cup since winners Arsenal qualified for Champions League.)

Source: Barclays Premier League
Rules for classification: 1) Points; 2) Goal difference; 3) Goals scored; 4) Play-offs (only if needed to decide champion, teams for relegation or teams for UEFA competitions).

==== Results summary ====
Overall								Home						Away					
Pld	W	D	L	GF	GA	GD	Pts	W	D	L	GF	GA	GD	W	D	L	GF	GA	GD
38	10	8	20	41	60	−19	38	5	3	11	21	27	−6	5	5	9	20	33	−13

Last updated: 11 May 2014.
Source: Premier League

==== Results per matchday ====
Matchday	1	2	3	4	5	6	7	8	9	10	11	12	13	14	15	16	17	18	19	20	21	22	23	24	25	26	27	28	29	30	31	32	33	34	35	36	37	38
Ground	H	A	A	H	A	H	H	A	H	A	H	A	A	H	H	A	H	A	A	H	A	H	H	A	H	A	H	H	A	H	A	H	A	A	H	A	H	H
Result	L	D	L	L	L	L	L	L	W	L	W	L	D	L	L	D	D	W	D	L	W	D	W	W	L	L	D	L	L	L	L	L	D	W	W	W	W	L
Position	15	15	19	20	20	20	20	20	19	19	19	20	19	20	20	20	20	20	20	20	19	19	17	14	17	18	18	18	18	19	20	20	20	20	17	17	14	14

Source: Statto.com
A = Away; H = Home; W = Win; D = Draw; L = Loss

==== Matches ====
17 August 2013 1	Sunderland	0–1	Fulham	Sunderland
15:00 BST		Report	Boateng (yellow card) 23'; Kasami 52'; Berbatov (yellow card) 85'; Duff (yellow card) 90+3'	Stadium: Stadium of Light; Attendance: 43,905; Referee: Neil Swarbrick

24 August 2013 2	Southampton	1–1	Sunderland	Southampton
15:00 BST	Ward-Prowse (yellow card) 27'; Osvaldo (yellow card) 83'; Fonte 88'	Report	Giaccherini 3'; Gardner (yellow card) 33'; Larsson (yellow card) 61'	Stadium: St Mary's Stadium; Attendance: 29,596; Referee: Lee Mason

31 August 2013 3	Crystal Palace	3–1	Sunderland	Selhurst
17:30 BST	Gabbidon 9'; Gayle 79' (pen.); O'Keefe 90+1'	BBC Report	Fletcher 65'	Stadium: Selhurst Park; Attendance: 22,671; Referee: Lee Probert

14 September 2013 4	Sunderland	1–3	Arsenal	Sunderland
15:00 BST	Gardner 48' (pen.)	BBC Report	Giroud 11'; Ramsey 67', 76'	Stadium: Stadium of Light; Attendance: 39,055; Referee: Martin Atkinson

21 September 2013 5	West Bromwich Albion	3–0	Sunderland	West Bromwich
15:00 BST	Sessègnon 20'; Ridgewell 76'; Amalfitano 90+3'	BBC Report	Colback (yellow card) 28'	Stadium: The Hawthorns; Attendance: 24,595; Referee: Phil Dowd

29 September 2013 6	Sunderland	1–3	Liverpool	Sunderland
16:00 BST	Giaccherini 52'	BBC Report	Sturridge 28'; Suárez 36', 89'	Stadium: Stadium of Light; Attendance: 41,415; Referee: Howard Webb

5 October 2013 7	Sunderland	1–2	Manchester United	Sunderland
17:30 BST	Gardner 5'	BBC Report	Januzaj 55', 61'	Stadium: Stadium of Light; Attendance: 45,426; Referee: Chris Foy

19 October 2013 8	Swansea City	4–0	Sunderland	Swansea, Wales
15:00 BST	Bardsley 57' (o.g.); De Guzmán 58'; Bony 64' (pen.); Fletcher 80' (o.g.)	BBC Report		Stadium: Liberty Stadium; Attendance: 20,245; Referee: Craig Pawson

27 October 2013 9	Sunderland	2–1	Newcastle United	Sunderland
13:30 BST	Fletcher 5', (yellow card) 5'; Borini 85'	Report	Cabaye (yellow card) 28'; Debuchy 57'	Stadium: Stadium of Light; Attendance: 46,313; Referee: Lee Probert

2 November 2013 10	Hull City	1–0	Sunderland	Hull
15:00 GMT	Cuéllar 25' (o.g.); Brady (yellow card) 88'; Figueroa (yellow card) 90'	Report	Cattermole (red card) 45+2'; Dossena (red card) 45+6'	Stadium: KC Stadium; Attendance: 24,677; Referee: Andre Marriner

10 November 2013 11	Sunderland	1–0	Manchester City	Sunderland
14:05 GMT	Bardsley 21'	Report	García (yellow card) 26'	Stadium: Stadium of Light; Attendance: 40,137; Referee: Mike Dean

23 November 2013 12	Stoke City	2–0	Sunderland	Stoke
15:00 GMT	Adam 30'; Pieters (yellow card) 69'; Arnautović (yellow card) 77'; Nzonzi 81'	Report	Brown (red card) 36'; Larsson (yellow card) 73'	Stadium: Britannia Stadium; Attendance: 26,007; Referee: Kevin Friend

30 November 2013 13	Aston Villa	0–0	Sunderland	Aston, Birmingham
15:00 GMT	Vlaar (yellow card) 32'; Agbonlahor (yellow card) 90'	Report	Bardsley (yellow card) 90'	Stadium: Villa Park; Attendance: 33,036; Referee: Neil Swarbrick

4 December 2013 14	Sunderland	3–4	Chelsea	Sunderland
19:45 GMT	Altidore 14', (yellow card) 90+5'; Dossena (yellow card) 39'; O'Shea 50'; Colback (yellow card) 50'; Bardsley (yellow card) 45+1', (goal) 86'	Report	Lampard 17'; Hazard 36', 62', (yellow card) 62'; Ramires (yellow card) 47'; Bardsley 84' (o.g.); Willian (yellow card) 89'	Stadium: Stadium of Light; Attendance: 40,652; Referee: Phil Dowd

7 December 2013 15	Sunderland	1–2	Tottenham Hotspur	Sunderland
15:00 GMT	Johnson 37'; Čelůstka (yellow card) 39'; Altidore (yellow card) 87'	report	Paulinho 43'; O'Shea 50' (o.g.)	Stadium: Stadium of Light; Attendance: 37,963; Referee: Lee Mason

14 December 2013 16	West Ham United	0–0	Sunderland	Upton Park
15:00 GMT	Noble (yellow card) 25'	Report		Stadium: Upton Park; Attendance: 31,843; Referee: Andre Marriner

21 December 2013 17	Sunderland	0–0	Norwich City	Sunderland
15:00 GMT	Larsson (yellow card) 76'; Borini (yellow card) 90+3'; Brown (red card) 90+3'	Report	Whittaker (yellow card) 49'	Stadium: Stadium of Light; Attendance: 37,778; Referee: Martin Atkinson

26 December 2013 18	Everton	0–1	Sunderland	Liverpool
15:00 GMT	Howard (red card) 23'; Barry (yellow card) 42'	Report	Ki 25' (pen.)	Stadium: Goodison Park; Attendance: 39,193; Referee: Lee Probert

28 December 2013 19	Cardiff City	2–2	Sunderland	Cardiff, Wales
17:30 GMT	Mutch (yellow card) 1', (goal) 6'; Campbell 58', (yellow card) 68'; Kim (yellow card) 58'; Cowie (yellow card) 90'	Report	(yellow card) 19' Cattermole; (yellow card) 60' Bardsley; 83' Fletcher; 90+5' Colback	Stadium: Cardiff City Stadium; Attendance: 27,247; Referee: Chris Foy

1 January 2014 20	Sunderland	0–1	Aston Villa	Sunderland
15:00 GMT	Giaccherini (yellow card) 23'; Ki (yellow card) 64'; Colback (yellow card) 90+1'; Altidore (yellow card) 90+1'	Report	Agbonlahor 15', (yellow card) 90+1'; Bacuna (yellow card) 41'; Delph (yellow card) 57'	Stadium: Stadium of Light; Attendance: 39,757; Referee: Mike Jones

11 January 2014 21	Fulham	1–4	Sunderland	Fulham
15:00 GMT	Sidwell (yellow card) 37', (goal) 52'; Riise (yellow card) 40'; Parker (yellow card) 60'	Report	Johnson 29', 69', 85' (pen.); Bardsley (yellow card) 30'; Ki 41'; Colback (yellow card) 58'; Johnson (yellow card) 71'	Stadium: Craven Cottage; Attendance: 25,564; Referee: Mike Dean

18 January 2014 22	Sunderland	2–2	Southampton	Sunderland
12:45 GMT	Cattermole (yellow card) 11'; Borini 32'; Ki (yellow card) 38'; Johnson 71'	Report	Rodriguez 4'; Lovren 31'	Stadium: Stadium of Light; Attendance: 38,115; Referee: Chris Foy

29 January 2014 23	Sunderland	1–0	Stoke City	Sunderland
19:45 GMT	Johnson 17'; Bardsley (yellow card) 45'; Borini (yellow card) 80'	Report	Nzonzi (yellow card) 34' (yellow-red card) 54'; Adam (yellow card) 41'; Wilson (yellow card) 51'	Stadium: Stadium of Light; Attendance: 34,745; Referee: Robert Madley

1 February 2014 24	Newcastle United	0–3	Sunderland	Newcastle
12:45 GMT	Santon (yellow card) 31'; Dummett (yellow card) 87'	Report	O'Shea (yellow card) 12'; Borini 19' (pen.), (yellow card) 20'; Johnson 23'; Colback 80'	Stadium: St James' Park; Attendance: 52,280; Referee: Phil Dowd

8 February 2014 25	Sunderland	0–2	Hull City	Sunderland
15:00 GMT	Brown (red card) 4'; Bridcutt (yellow card) 45+2'	Report	Rosenior (yellow card) 11'; Long 16'; Livermore (yellow card) 41'; Jelavić (yellow card) 61', (goal) 62'	Stadium: Stadium of Light; Attendance: 42,810; Referee: Mike Jones

22 February 2014 26	Arsenal	4–1	Sunderland	Holloway
15:00 GMT	Giroud 5', 31'; Rosický 42'; Koscielny 57'	Report	Giaccherini (yellow card) 53', (goal) 81'	Stadium: Emirates Stadium; Attendance: 60,012; Referee: Andre Marriner

15 March 2014 27	Sunderland	0–0	Crystal Palace	Sunderland
15:00 GMT	Bridcutt (yellow card) 19'; Larsson (yellow card) 57'; Gardner (yellow card) 64'; Brown (yellow card) 79'	Report	Mariappa (yellow card) 8'; Ward (yellow card) 13'; Dikgacoi (yellow card) 45+2'; Delaney (yellow card) 58'	Stadium: Stadium of Light; Attendance: 43,636; Referee: Neil Swarbrick

22 March 2014 28	Norwich City	2–0	Sunderland	Norwich
15:00 GMT	Snodgrass 20'; Tettey 32'; Howson (yellow card) 47'; Snodgrass (yellow card) 69'	Report	Colback (yellow card) 37'; Cattermole (yellow card) 43'; Bridcutt (yellow card) 66'; Alonso (yellow card) 77' (yellow-red card) 90+2'; Bardsley (yellow card) 81'	Stadium: Carrow Road; Attendance: 26,654; Referee: Phil Dowd

26 March 2014 29	Liverpool	2–1	Sunderland	Liverpool
20:00 GMT	Gerrard 39'; Sturridge 48'	Report	Vergini (yellow card) 37'; Bardsley (yellow card) 40'; Ki 76'	Stadium: Anfield; Attendance: 44,524; Referee: Kevin Friend

31 March 2014 30	Sunderland	1–2	West Ham United	Sunderland
20:00 BST	Johnson 65'; Alonso (yellow card) 72'; Wickham (yellow card) 75'	Report	Noble (yellow card) 3'; Carroll 9'; Diamé 50'; Nolan (yellow card) 67'; Adrián (yellow card) 90+2'	Stadium: Stadium of Light; Attendance: 37,396; Referee: Howard Webb

7 April 2014 31	Tottenham Hotspur	5–1	Sunderland	Tottenham
20:00 BST	Adebayor 28', 86'; Kane 59'; Eriksen 78'; Sigurðsson 90'	Report	Cattermole 17' (yellow card) 42'; Alonso (yellow card) 21'	Stadium: White Hart Lane; Attendance: 34,410; Referee: Lee Mason

12 April 2014 32	Sunderland	0–1	Everton	Sunderland
15:07 BST	Johnson (yellow card) 19'; Bardsley (yellow card) 54'; Larsson (yellow card) 88'	Report	Coleman (yellow card) 53'; Brown 75' (o.g.)	Stadium: Stadium of Light; Attendance: 38,445; Referee: Lee Probert

16 April 2014 33	Manchester City	2–2	Sunderland	Manchester
19:45 BST	Fernandinho 2'; Nasri 88'; Zabaleta (yellow card) 90+2'	Report	Borini (yellow card) 32'; Alonso (yellow card) 65'; Wickham 73', 83'	Stadium: City of Manchester Stadium; Attendance: 47,046; Referee: Martin Atkinson

19 April 2014 34	Chelsea	1–2	Sunderland	Fulham
17:30 BST	Eto'o 12'; Torres (yellow card) 90+2'	Report	Wickham 18'; Cattermole (yellow card) 56'; Brown (yellow card) 73'; Borini 82' (pen.)	Stadium: Stamford Bridge; Attendance: 41,210; Referee: Mike Dean

27 April 2014 35	Sunderland	4–0	Cardiff City	Sunderland
12:00 BST	Wickham 26', 86'; Vergini (yellow card) 37'; Borini 45+1' (pen.), (yellow card) 88'; Larsson (yellow card) 54'; Giaccherini 76', (yellow card) 77'; Gardner (yellow card) 90+4'	Report	Mutch (yellow card) 37'; Medel (yellow card) 39'; Cala (red card) 45'; Fábio (yellow card) 53'	Stadium: Stadium of Light; Attendance: 45,859; Referee: Phil Dowd

3 May 2014 36	Manchester United	0–1	Sunderland	Manchester
15:00 BST	Carrick (yellow card) 26'; Vidić (yellow card) 90+1'	Report	Larsson 30'; Alonso (yellow card) 31'	Stadium: Old Trafford; Attendance: 75,347; Referee: Howard Webb

7 May 2014 37	Sunderland	2–0	West Bromwich Albion	Sunderland
19:45 BST	Colback 13'; Borini 31'	Report		Stadium: Stadium of Light; Attendance: 45,181; Referee: Lee Mason

11 May 2014 38	Sunderland	1–3	Swansea City	Sunderland
15:00 BST	Borini 50', (yellow card) 83'; Bridcutt (yellow card) 85'	Report	Dyer 7'; Emnes 14', (yellow card) 55'; Fulton (yellow card) 20'; Bony 54'; Amat (yellow card) 69'	Stadium: Stadium of Light; Attendance: 45,580; Referee: Chris Foy

Last updated: 11 May 2014
Source: Sunderland AFC

=== League Cup ===
27 August 2013 Second round	Sunderland	4–2	MK Dons	Sunderland
19:45 BST	Altidore 78'; Roberge (yellow card) 82'; Wickham 87', 89'; Johnson 90+6', (yellow card) 90+6'	Report	Bamford 7', (yellow card) 9'; Baldock (yellow card) 28'; McLeod 55'; McLoughlin (yellow card) 87'	Stadium: Stadium of Light; Attendance: 18,992; Referee: David Coote

24 September 2013 Third round	Sunderland	2–0	Peterborough	Sunderland
19:45 BST	Ki (yellow card) 7'; Giaccherini 32'; Cuéllar (yellow card) 49'; Colback (yellow card) 58'; Johnson (yellow card) 69'; Roberge 74'	Report	Swanson (yellow card) 88'	Stadium: Stadium of Light; Attendance: 18,126; Referee: Michael Naylor

6 November 2013 Fourth round	Sunderland	2–1	Southampton	Sunderland
19:45 GMT	Ki (yellow card) 45+1'; Bardsley 59'; Larsson 86', (yellow card) 90+5'; Gardner (yellow card) 90+2'	Report	Cork (yellow card) 58'; Hooiveld (yellow card) 75'; Yoshida 88'	Stadium: Stadium of Light; Attendance: 15,966; Referee: Lee Mason

17 December 2013 Fifth round	Sunderland	2–1 (a.e.t.)	Chelsea	Sunderland
19:45 GMT	Dossena (yellow card) 28'; Borini 88'; Ki 119', (yellow card) 119'	Report	David Luiz (yellow card) 25'; Cattermole 46' (o.g.); Essien (yellow card) 110'	Stadium: Stadium of Light; Attendance: 20,731; Referee: Anthony Taylor

7 January 2014 Semi-final; First Leg	Sunderland	2–1	Man Utd	Sunderland
19:45 GMT	Giggs 45+2' (o.g.); Giaccherini (yellow card) 51'; Bardsley (yellow card) 60'; Borini 64' (pen.); Altidore (yellow card) 77'; Mannone (yellow card) 90+4'	Report	Evra (yellow card) 24'; Vidić 52'; Rafael (yellow card) 63'; Smalling (yellow card) 83'	Stadium: Stadium of Light; Attendance: 31,547; Referee: Andre Marriner

22 January 2014 Semi-final; Second Leg	Man Utd	2–1 (a.e.t.) (3–3 agg.) (1–2 p)	Sunderland	Manchester
19:45 GMT	Evans 37'; Jones (yellow card) 113'; Januzaj (yellow card) 116'; Hernández 120+1'	Report	Borini (yellow card) 65'; O'Shea (yellow card) 90+3'; Gardner (yellow card) 110'; Alonso (yellow card) 118'; Bardsley 119'	Stadium: Old Trafford; Attendance: 71,019; Referee: Lee Mason
	Penalties
	Welbeck (penalty missed); D. Fletcher (penalty scored); Januzaj (penalty missed); Jones (penalty missed); Rafael (penalty missed)		(penalty missed) Gardner; (penalty missed) S. Fletcher; (penalty scored) Alonso; (penalty scored) Ki; (penalty missed) Johnson

2 March 2014 Final	Sunderland	1–3	Manchester City	Wembley
14:00 GMT	Borini 10'; Alonso (yellow card) 81'		Touré 55'; Nasri 56'; Navas 90'; Negredo (yellow card) 90+3'	Stadium: Wembley Stadium; Attendance: 84,697; Referee: Martin Atkinson

=== FA Cup ===
5 January 2014 Third round	Sunderland	3–1	Carlisle United	Sunderland
14:00 GMT	Johnson 34'; O'Hanlon 34' (o.g.); Ba 90'	Report	O'Hanlon (yellow card) 29'; Robson 43'	Stadium: Stadium of Light; Attendance: 21,973; Referee: Neil Swarbrick

25 January 2014 Fourth round	Sunderland	1–0	Kidderminster Harriers	Sunderland
15:00 GMT	Mavrias 6', (yellow card) 45+1'; Ba (yellow card) 51'	Report	Storer (yellow card) 65'	Stadium: Stadium of Light; Attendance: 25,081; Referee: Roger East

15 February 2014 Fifth round	Sunderland	1–0	Southampton	Sunderland
12:45 GMT	Gardner 49'; Larsson (yellow card) 90+2'	Report	Yoshida (yellow card) 25'; S. Davis (yellow card) 42'; Rodriguez (yellow card) 90'	Stadium: Stadium of Light; Attendance: 16,777; Referee: Mike Dean

9 March 2014 Sixth round	Hull City	3–0	Sunderland	Hull
15:00 GMT	Huddlestone (yellow card) 15'; Davies 67'; Meyler 71'; Fryatt 76'	Report	Cattermole (yellow card) 29'; Scocco (yellow card) 65'	Stadium: KC Stadium; Attendance: 20,047; Referee: Craig Pawson

== Statistics ==
=== Appearances ===
Numbers in parentheses denote appearances as substitute.
Players with no appearances not included in the list.

Last updated on 11 May 2014

No.	Pos.	Nat.	Name	Premier League	FA Cup	League Cup	Total
No.	Pos.	Nat.	Name	Apps	Apps	Apps	Apps
2	DF	SCO	Phil Bardsley	26	1 (1)	4 (1)	31 (2)
3	DF	ITA	Andrea Dossena	6 (1)	3	1	10 (1)
4	MF	KOR	Ki Sung-yueng	25 (2)	1	6	32 (2)
5	DF	ENG	Wes Brown	24 (1)	1	5	30 (1)
6	MF	CPV	Cabral	1	0	1	2
7	MF	SWE	Sebastian Larsson	24 (7)	4	4 (2)	32 (9)
8	MF	ENG	Craig Gardner	8 (10)	2 (1)	3 (2)	13 (13)
9	FW	SCO	Steven Fletcher	13 (7)	1	2 (2)	16 (9)
10	FW	ENG	Connor Wickham	10 (5)	0 (1)	0 (2)	10 (8)
11	MF	ENG	Adam Johnson	28 (8)	1 (1)	6 (1)	35 (10)
12	DF	CZE	Ondřej Čelůstka	14 (7)	3	3	20 (7)
14	MF	ENG	Jack Colback	28 (5)	2 (2)	5	35 (7)
15	MF	WAL	David Vaughan	2 (1)	0	1	3 (1)
16	MF	IRL	John O'Shea	33	2	7	42
17	FW	USA	Jozy Altidore	19 (12)	2	4 (2)	25 (14)
19	FW	SWE	David Moberg Karlsson	0	0	1	1
20	GK	IRL	Keiren Westwood	10	0	1	11
21	DF	FRA	Modibo Diakité	7	1	0	8
22	MF	FRA	El Hadji Ba	0 (1)	1 (1)	0	1 (2)
23	MF	ITA	Emanuele Giaccherini	16 (8)	3	4 (1)	23 (9)
24	DF	ESP	Carlos Cuéllar	4	0	1	5
25	GK	ITA	Vito Mannone	28 (1)	1	6	35 (1)
26	MF	SCO	Liam Bridcutt	9 (3)	0	0	9 (3)
27	DF	ARG	Santiago Vergini	10 (1)	3	0	13 (1)
27	FW	KOR	Ji Dong-won	2 (3)	1	1	4 (3)
28	DF	ESP	Marcos Alonso	16	0 (1)	3	19 (1)
29	DF	FRA	Valentin Roberge	7 (2)	1	1 (1)	9 (3)
30	FW	ARG	Ignacio Scocco	0 (6)	2	0	2 (6)
31	FW	ITA	Fabio Borini	25 (7)	1 (2)	3 (2)	29 (11)
32	GK	ARG	Oscar Ustari	0	3	0	3
33	MF	ENG	Lee Cattermole	20 (2)	3	5	28 (2)
35	MF	GRE	Charis Mavrias	1 (3)	1	0 (1)	2 (4)
41	FW	ENG	Duncan Watmore	0	0 (1)	0	0 (1)

=== Goalscorers ===
This includes all competitive matches.

Last updated on 11 May 2014

Rank	No.	Pos.	Name	Premier League	FA Cup	League Cup	Total
1	11	MF	Adam Johnson	8	1	1	10
1	31	FW	Fabio Borini	7	0	3	10
3	10	FW	Connor Wickham	5	0	2	7
4	23	MF	Emanuele Giaccherini	4	0	1	5
5	4	MF	Ki Sung-yueng	3	0	1	4
5	2	DF	Phil Bardsley	2	0	2	4
7	9	FW	Steven Fletcher	3	0	0	3
7	14	MF	Jack Colback	3	0	0	3
7	8	MF	Craig Gardner	2	1	0	3
10	17	FW	Jozy Altidore	1	0	1	2
10	7	MF	Sebastian Larsson	1	0	1	2
10	Own Goals			0	1	1	2
13	16	DF	John O'Shea	1	0	0	1
13	33	MF	Lee Cattermole	1	0	0	1
13	29	DF	Valentin Roberge	0	0	1	1
13	22	MF	El Hadji Ba	0	1	0	1
13	35	MF	Charis Mavrias	0	1	0	1
TOTALS				41	5	14	60

=== Clean sheets ===
This includes all competitive matches.

Last updated on 7 May 2014

Rank	No.	Pos.	Name	Premier League	FA Cup	League Cup	Total
1	25	GK	Vito Mannone	11	0	0	11
2	32	GK	Oscar Ustari	0	2	0	2
3	20	GK	Keiren Westwood	0	0	1	1
TOTALS				11	2	1	14

=== Disciplinary record ===
This includes all competitive matches.

Last updated on 11 May 2014

Pos.	No.	Player	Premier League		FA Cup		League Cup		Total	
Pos.	No.	Player	Booked	Sent off (straight red)	Booked	Sent off (straight red)	Booked	Sent off (straight red)	Booked	Sent off (straight red)
2	DF	Phil Bardsley	10	0	0	0	1	0	11	0
3	DF	Andrea Dossena	1	1	0	0	1	0	2	1
4	MF	Ki Sung-yueng	3	0	0	0	3	0	6	0
5	DF	Wes Brown	2	3	0	0	0	0	2	3
7	MF	Sebastian Larsson	6	0	1	0	1	0	8	0
8	MF	Craig Gardner	5	0	0	0	2	0	7	0
9	FW	Steven Fletcher	1	0	0	0	0	0	1	0
10	FW	Connor Wickham	1	0	0	0	0	0	1	0
11	MF	Adam Johnson	2	0	0	0	2	0	4	0
12	DF	Ondřej Čelůstka	1	0	0	0	0	0	1	0
14	MF	Jack Colback	6	0	0	0	1	0	7	0
16	DF	John O'Shea	2	1	0	0	1	0	3	1
17	FW	Jozy Altidore	3	0	0	0	1	0	4	0
22	MF	El Hadji Ba	0	0	1	0	0	0	1	0
23	MF	Emanuele Giaccherini	4	0	0	0	1	0	5	0
24	DF	Carlos Cuéllar	0	0	0	0	1	0	1	0
25	GK	Vito Mannone	0	0	0	0	1	0	1	0
26	MF	Liam Bridcutt	4	0	0	0	0	0	4	0
27	DF	Santiago Vergini	2	0	0	0	0	0	2	0
28	DF	Marcos Alonso	5	1	0	0	2	0	7	1
29	DF	Valentin Roberge	1	0	0	0	1	0	2	0
30	FW	Ignacio Scocco	0	0	1	0	0	0	1	0
31	FW	Fabio Borini	6	0	0	0	1	0	7	0
33	MF	Lee Cattermole	5	1	1	0	0	0	6	1
35	MF	Charis Mavrias	0	0	1	0	0	0	1	0
TOTALS			69	7	4	0	20	0	93	7
