= Alejandro Delorte =

Argentine football striker

Personal information
- Full name: Alejandro Darío Delorte
- Date of birth: June 2, 1978 (age 48)
- Place of birth: Cabildo, Argentina
- Height: 1.98 m (6 ft 6 in)
- Position: Centre forward

Team information
- Current team: Sansinena

Youth career
- 1999–2000: Pacífico de Cabildo

Senior career*
Years	Team	Apps	(Gls)
2000–2005	Olimpo	122	(29)
2005–2006	Gimnasia LP	18	(4)
2006–2007	Olimpo	17	(3)
2006–2007	Peñarol	15	(5)
2007–2008	Brescia	0	(0)
2007–2008	Argentinos Juniors	32	(8)
2008–2009	Aris Thessaloniki	4	(0)
2009	Deportivo Táchira	12	(5)
2009–2011	Olimpo	49	(8)
2011–2012	Oriente Petrolero	14	(6)
2012	Gimnasia de Jujuy	18	(4)
2012–2013	Gimnasia de Mendoza	21	(7)
2013–2014	Estudiantes	33	(4)
2014	Deportivo Maipú	11	(1)
2015–2016	San Martín de Burzaco	14	(1)
2017	Bella Vista	15	(1)
2019	Pacífico de Cabildo		
2020	Club Sporting	0	(0)
2020–	Sansinena	3	(0)
- * Club domestic league appearances and goals as of 11:37, 16 January 2021 (UTC)

Alejandro Delorte (born 2 June 1978, in Cabildo) is an Argentine football striker. He currently plays for Sansinena.

== Career ==
=== Club career ===
Delorte started his professional career with Olimpo de Bahía Blanca in 2000. Along with Raul Oscar Schmidt and Jose Ramón Palacio, (Rodrigos's father), he is one of the most prolific players ever emerged from that club. In 2001, he helped Olimpo to win the Apertura 2001 title and promotion to the Primera División Argentina.

In 2005 Delorte joined Club de Gimnasia y Esgrima La Plata but he rejoined Olimpo in 2006 before moving to C.A. Peñarol in Uruguay and then Brescia Calcio in Italy.

Between 2007 and 2008 he played for Argentinos Juniors where his eight goals helped the club to qualify for Copa Sudamericana 2008.

Between 2008 and the beginning of 2009 he played for Aris Salonica. He joined Deportivo Táchira of Venezuela in 2009.

In 2011, he signed with Oriente Petrolero from Bolivia.

== Titles ==
Season	Club	Title
Apertura 2001	Olimpo	Primera B Nacional
