= Cyril Domoraud =

Ivorian footballer (born 1971)

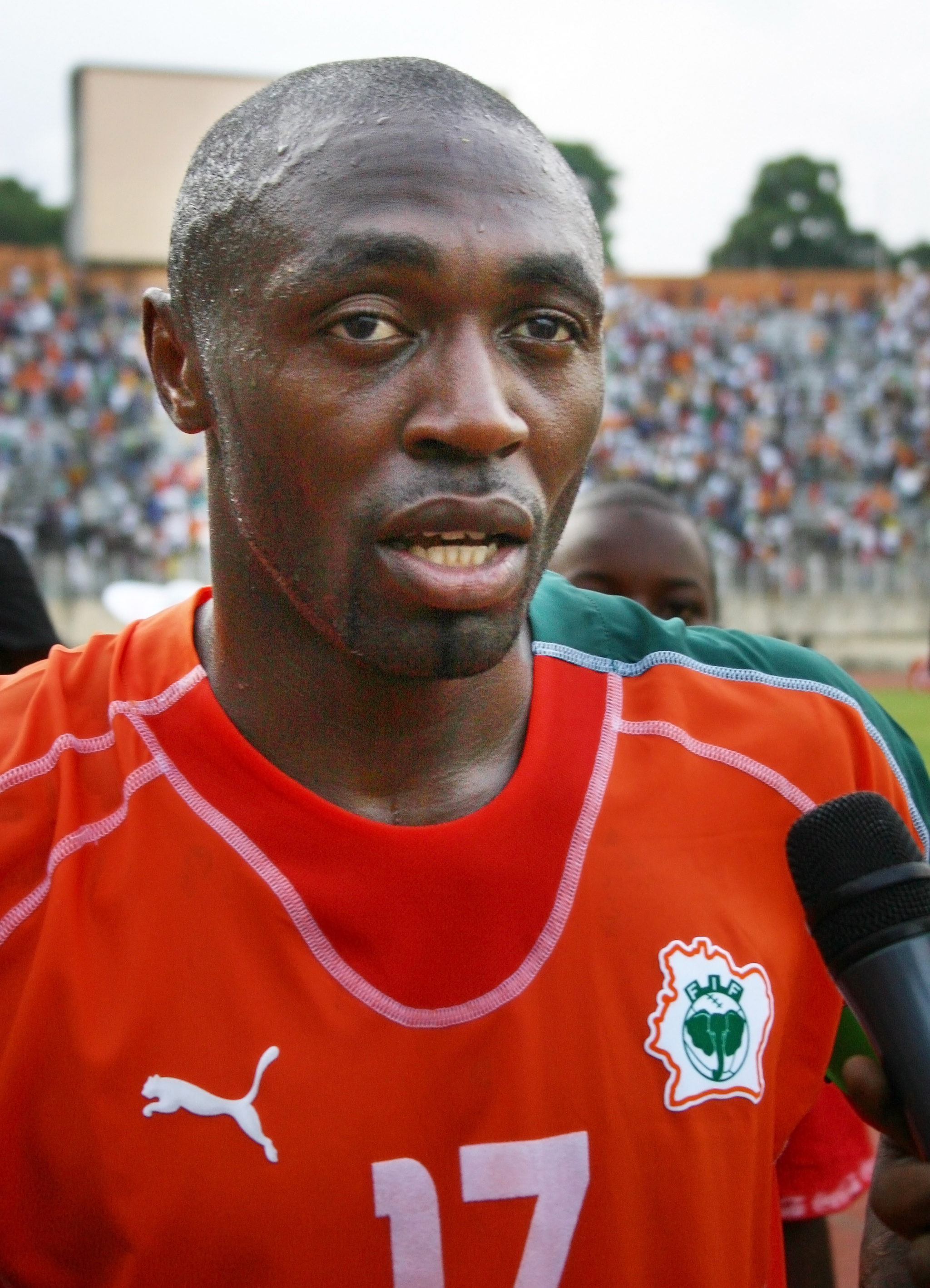

Personal information
- Full name: Dépri Cyrille Léandre Domoraud
- Date of birth: 22 July 1971 (age 55)
- Place of birth: Lakota, Ivory Coast
- Height: 1.81 m (5 ft 11 in)
- Position: Defender

Senior career*
Years	Team	Apps	(Gls)
1992–1994	Créteil	19	(0)
1994–1996	Red Star Saint-Ouen	69	(0)
1996–1997	Bordeaux	31	(1)
1997–1999	Marseille	56	(1)
1999–2001	Internazionale	6	(0)
2000–2001	→ Bastia (loan)	21	(1)
2001–2004	Milan	0	(0)
2001–2002	→ Monaco (loan)	22	(0)
2002–2004	→ Espanyol (loan)	69	(4)
2004	Konyaspor	4	(0)
2005–2007	Créteil	58	(3)
2007	Stella Club d'Adjamé	?	(?)
2008	Africa Sports	?	(?)
Total		355	(10)

International career
1995–2006	Ivory Coast	51	(0)

Managerial career
- 2001–: Cyril Domoraud Centre
- 2010–: Ivory Coast (Assistant coach)
- * Club domestic league appearances and goals

Dépri Cyrille Léandre Domoraud (born 22 July 1971) is an Ivorian former professional footballer who played as a defender. He also holds French nationality and spent most of his career in Western Europe. He played in 3 of the 5 top leagues in the UEFA: Serie A, La Liga and Ligue 1. At international level, he represented Ivory Coast.

== Club career ==
Domoraud started his career at France for clubs in the suburbs of Paris: Créteil and Red Star Saint-Ouen. In 1996, he joined Girondins de Bordeaux of Ligue 1, where he played 31 league appearances. In the next season, he signed for Olympique de Marseille, where he played at 1999 UEFA Cup Final.

=== Italy ===
He was signed by Italian team Internazionale in 1999. He played just 6 league matches, with 5 of them being in the first two and a half months of the season. He also played in the league playoffs for the UEFA Cup, in the 2nd leg of the 1999–2000 Coppa Italia final and in the 2000 Supercoppa Italiana. On 18 September 2000, he was loaned out to Ligue 1 club SC Bastia.

During the 2000–01 season, Domoraud moved to cross-town rivals AC Milan, in exchange with Thomas Helveg. He was tagged for 22,000 million lire (€11,362,052) and Helveg undisclosed.

=== Espanyol ===
In August 2002, Domoraud left for La Liga side Espanyol. He was a regular in the team, and played 69 times in the Spanish top division.

=== Late career ===
In August 2004, Domoraud signed a two-year contract with Turkish Süper Lig side Konyaspor. He played just 4 league matches before terminating his contract in January 2005. He returned to his first professional club Créteil and played 58 league matches in two and a half Ligue 2 seasons. He then returned to Ivory Coast for Stella Club d'Adjamé and Africa Sports.

== International career ==
Domoraud holds the distinction of being the oldest player on the 2006 World Cup Ivory Coast national football team, and the most experienced with 47 international caps.

== Coaching career ==
In 2001, Domoraud founded his own football school in Bouaké, the Cyril Domoraud Centre. On 28 May 2010, he was named as assistant coach of Sven-Göran Eriksson by the Ivory Coast national football team for the 2010 World Cup.

== Personal life ==
Domoraud became a Christian in 1999. He is the older brother of Gilles and Jean-Jacques.

== Honours ==
Ivory Coast

- Africa Cup of Nations runner-up:2006
