= Piotr Włodarczyk =

Polish footballer (born 1977)

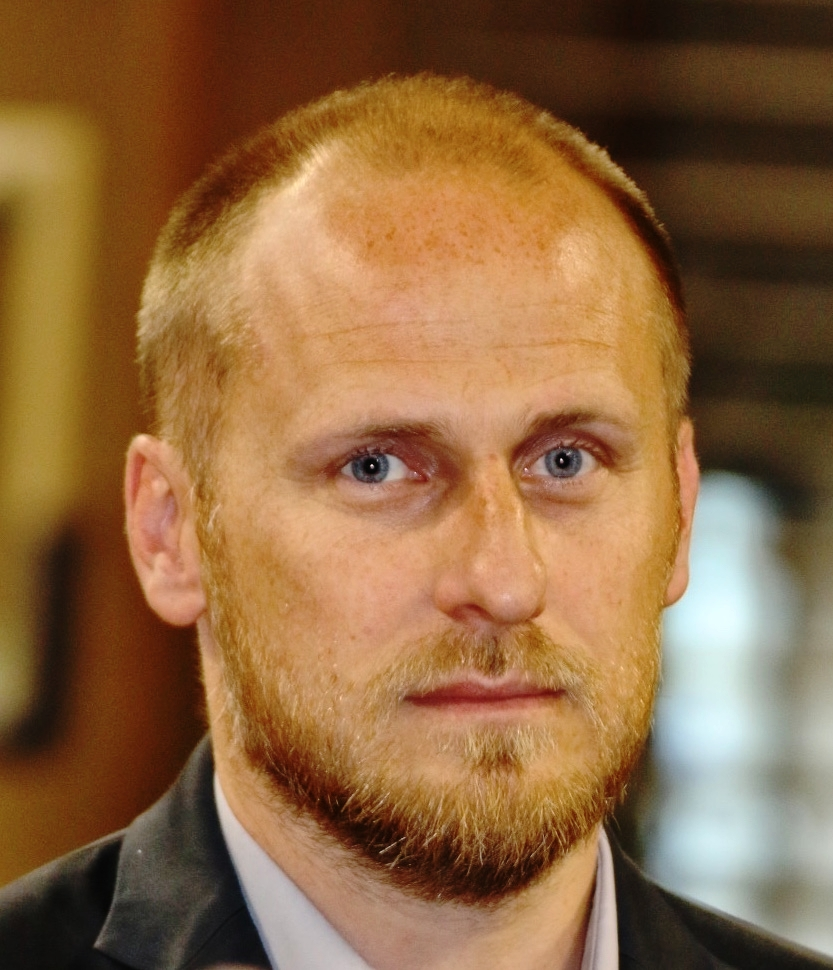

Personal information
- Full name: Piotr Stanisław Włodarczyk
- Date of birth: 4 May 1977 (age 49)
- Place of birth: Wałbrzych, Poland
- Height: 1.86 m (6 ft 1 in)
- Position: Forward

Youth career
- Zagłębie Wałbrzych

Senior career*
Years	Team	Apps	(Gls)
–1996	KP Wałbrzych		
1996–1997	Legia Warsaw	17	(3)
1997–1998	Ruch Chorzów	24	(6)
1998	Legia Warsaw	15	(0)
1998–2000	Ruch Chorzów	41	(17)
2000–2002	Śląsk Wrocław	34	(10)
2002	AJ Auxerre	7	(0)
2002–2004	Widzew Łódź	41	(14)
2004–2007	Legia Warsaw	90	(39)
2007–2008	Zagłębie Lubin	22	(3)
2008–2009	Aris	18	(2)
2009–2011	OFI	55	(11)
2011–2012	Bałtyk Gdynia	27	(2)

International career
1999–2004	Poland	4	(2)
- * Club domestic league appearances and goals

Piotr Włodarczyk (Polish pronunciation: [ˈpjɔtr vwɔˈdart͡ʂɨk]; born 4 May 1977) is a Polish former professional footballer who played as a forward. He is a former member of the Poland national team. He played a total of four games, scoring twice.

== Career ==
Włodarczyk returned to Legia Warsaw's first team on 8 March 2006 and put in some strong performances to close the season. In June 2008, he was transferred to Aris FC having the opportunity to participate in the forthcoming UEFA Cup.

== Style of play ==
Włodarczyk was known for his skill in getting into good shooting positions.

== Personal life ==
He is the brother of heptathlete Urszula Włodarczyk and the father of footballer Szymon Włodarczyk.

== Career statistics ==
=== International ===
Appearances and goals by national team and year
National team	Year	Apps	Goals
Poland
Poland	1999	1	0
Poland	2004	3	2
Total		4	2

Scores and results list Poland's goal tally first, score column indicates score after each Włodarczyk goal.

List of international goals scored by Piotr Włodarczyk
No.	Date	Venue	Opponent	Score	Result	Competition
1	11 July 2004	Soldier Field, Chicago, United States	United States	1–0	1–1	Friendly
2	4 September 2004	Windsor Park, Belfast, Northern Ireland	Northern Ireland	2–0	3–0	2006 FIFA World Cup qualification

== Honours ==
Legia Warsaw

- Ekstraklasa: 2005–06
- Polish Cup: 1996–97

Zagłębie Lubin

- Polish Super Cup: 2007

Individual

- Polish Cup top scorer: 2005–06
