= Nicolás Tagliani =

Argentine footballer

Personal information
- Full name: Nicolás Martín Tagliani
- Date of birth: 30 January 1975 (age 51)
- Place of birth: Buenos Aires, Argentina
- Height: 1.82 m (6 ft 0 in)
- Position: Forward

Senior career*
Years	Team	Apps	(Gls)
1996–1998	Estudiantes LP	40	(2)
1998–1999	Quilmes	13	(1)
1999–2000	Delémont	1	(0)
2000	Palestino	25	(13)
2001–2002	Cobreloa	24	(3)
2002	Colo-Colo	23	(1)
2003	Alianza Lima	13	(2)
2004	Wilstermann	19	(8)
2004–2005	UA Maracaibo	5	(0)
2005	Real Cartagena	10	(2)
2006	Aris Salonica	0	(0)
2006	Latina	4	(0)
2006	Vado	–	(–)
2007	Deportivo Temuco	15	(2)
2008	Tavolara	–	(–)
Total		192	(34)
- * Club domestic league appearances and goals

Nicolás Martín Tagliani (born 30 January 1975) is an Argentine former professional footballer who played as a forward for clubs in Argentina, Chile, Colombia, Bolivia, Peru, Venezuela, Switzerland, Greece and Italy..

== Honours ==
Colo-Colo

- Primera División de Chile: 2002 Clausura

Alianza Lima

- Peruvian Primera División: 2003 Descentralizado

Jorge Wilstermann

- Bolivian Primera División: 2004

Unión Atlético Maracaibo

- Venezuelan Primera División: 2004–05
