= Georgios Gougoulias =

German-born Greek footballer

Personal information
- Date of birth: 7 February 1983 (age 43)
- Place of birth: Schweinfurt, West Germany
- Height: 1.85 m (6 ft 1 in)
- Position: Striker

Team information
- Current team: Aris Thessaloniki F.C. (team manager)

Senior career*
Years	Team	Apps	(Gls)
2001–2002	1. FC Schweinfurt 05	0	(0)
2002–2003	TSV Großbardorf	24	(23)
2003–2004	SSV Reutlingen	0	(0)
2004–2005	TSV Großbardorf	13	(10)
2005–2006	Pavlos Melas FC	26	(7)
2005–2007	Aris	7	(1)
2007–2008	Panserraikos	33	(13)
2009	PAS Giannina	6	(2)
2009–2012	Pierikos	86	(17)
2012–2013	Panserraikos	23	(2)
2013–2014	Apollon Kalamarias	5	(1)
2014	Digenis Lakkomatos		
2014–2015	Panserraikos		
- * Club domestic league appearances and goals as of 2026

Georgios Gougoulias (Greek: Γιώργος Γκουγκουλιάς) is a Greek former football striker. Of Greek descent, he was born and spent his childhood in Schweinfurt, Germany where he started playing football at its academy. His senior football, started at Reutlingen and Grossbardorf, before eventually moving to Greece in 2004 signing with Pavlos Melas FC.

== Football characteristics ==
Georgios is known as a taller footballer who is accredited for his jumping/header abilities. It is also noted that Georgios was considered to have a considerable game iq that would allow him to find goal opportunities. At younger age, Georgios commonly played more demoted attacking positions (as a forward behind a main striker or left forward, at times an AM) but has not been tried on these positions in his modern career. Currently, he plays as a striker.

== Aris ==
The following year he joined Aris FC, at the beginning of Aris' second division adventure 2005/06 and immediately established himself as a starting line-up player, scoring several goals, especially in the first part of the season when Aris rather had a mediocre start. At the time, attacking with him played Ioakim Beniskos with all rounder Fernando Sanjurjo behind, and Caceres striking more from left. At the half-season Christmas break, Aris did not look particularly good (yet not that far from the top of the division either) and they needed some strengthening transfers in order to immediately bounce back and return to the A category. They bought Ethymis Kouloucheris (defender) and even more importantly Paulo Costa and Nikos Skarmoutsos to empower their attack. The buys seemed exactly spot on, all immediately establishing themselves in the line up, helping Aris a lot in the attacking sector, which further meant that Gougoulias' starting spot had been in doubt, eventually losing it, with only being an occasional starter, consequently dropping his great scoring ratio.

Aris came back to the first division, and in the season 2006/07, after huge roster sweeping where Aris totally lived a rebirth and squad upgrades with superior quality players, compared to the previous seasons, with the likes of Koke, Javito, Weisheimer etc., Gougoulias lost completely his spot and never was trusted by coaches Hoyos and Quique Hernandez at the time.

In the season 2007/08 Bajević firstly decided to count on him, keeping him in roster, but soon afterwards he suffered one serious injury that parted him from pitch for almost half of the year. After that, never regained the needed form, but again Bajević did not want to completely write him off. He gave him a chance in the second half against AEK at Kleanthis Vikelidis (0:1 loss), mainly due to eventual lack of attacking options at the time, where he played very disappointingly and after the match, he was never recounted by Aris any more.

== Post-Aris days ==
First part of the season 2008/09 he spent at PAS Giannina in the second division scoring a couple of goals, but PAS did not get what expected from him after the brighter start and first couple of goals.

At the winter transfer period of 2008-09 he signed for Panserraikos, but making no serious impact generally coming on from bench.
