= Jean-Jacques Domoraud =

Ivorian footballer (born 1981)

Personal information
- Full name: Jean-Jacques Domoraud Dakaud Otto
- Date of birth: 1 March 1981 (age 45)
- Place of birth: Man, Ivory Coast
- Height: 1.80 m (5 ft 11 in)
- Position: Defender

Senior career*
Years	Team	Apps	(Gls)
2000–2001	Racing Besançon		
2001–2003	Sochaux	13	(0)
2003–2004	Le Mans	11	(0)
2004–2005	Servette	5	(0)
2005–2006	US Créteil	22	(0)
2007	Gent	5	(0)
- * Club domestic league appearances and goals

Jean-Jacques Domoraud Dakaud Otto (born 1 March 1981) is an Ivorian former professional footballer who played as a defender.

== Personal life ==
Domoraud holds both Ivorian and French nationalities. He is the younger brother of Cyril and Gilles.
