= Tinga (footballer, born 1981) =

Brazilian footballer

Personal information
- Full name: Paulo Edson Nascimento Costa
- Date of birth: 15 May 1981 (age 45)
- Place of birth: Porto Alegre, Brazil
- Height: 1.78 m (5 ft 10 in)
- Position: Defender

Team information
- Current team: Ferroviário

Senior career*
Years	Team	Apps	(Gls)
2006	Veranópolis		
2006	Aris Thessaloniki F.C.	16	(0)
2007–2008	APOP Kinyras Peyias	12	(5)
2008–2010	AEP Paphos	47	(3)
2011–2012	Cruzeiro RS	33	(0)
2012	Concórdia	5	(0)
2013–	Ferroviário	15	(1)
- * Club domestic league appearances and goals

Paulo Edson Nascimento Costa or Tinga (born 15 May 1981) is a Brazilian football right full back who plays for Ferroviário. He started his career in Brazil, at Santos FC and at Aris Thessaloniki F.C.
