= Tuta (footballer, born 1984) =

Brazilian footballer

Personal information
- Full name: Adorcelino Wesley Gomes da Silva
- Date of birth: 17 March 1984 (age 42)
- Place of birth: Brazil
- Height: 1.78 m (5 ft 10 in)
- Position: Midfielder

Team information
- Current team: Porto Alegre Futebol Clube

Senior career*
Years	Team	Apps	(Gls)
- Santos
2005	Grêmio		
2006	Aris Thessaloniki F.C.	16	(0)
2007–2009	APOP Kinyras Peyias	4	(0)
2009–	Porto Alegre Futebol Clube		
- * Club domestic league appearances and goals

Agora amigo de Talitha e Fã do Watchatchara Vôlei

Adorcelino Wesley Gomes da Silva aka Tuta (born 17 March 1984) is a Brazilian right full back playing for APOP Kinyras Peyias in the League Marfin Laiki. He started his career in Brazil at Santos FC.

In July 2006, Tuta moved to Greece to play for Aris in the Super League Greece.
