= Fernando Sanjurjo =

Argentine footballer

Personal information
- Full name: Fernando Manuel Sanjurjo
- Date of birth: July 9, 1982 (age 44)
- Place of birth: San Martín, Buenos Aires, Argentina
- Height: 1.73 m (5 ft 8 in)
- Position: Midfielder

Team information
- Current team: Sportivo Patria

Senior career*
Years	Team	Apps	(Gls)
1999–2001	Ferro		
2001–2002	Defensores de Belgrano		
2002–2003	San Telmo		
2003–2004	Club River Plate (Asunción)		
2004–2006	Aris	24	(5)
2006–2007	PAS Giannina		
2008	Diagoras		
2008–2009	Pyrsos Grevena F.C.		
2010	Jorge Wilstermann	30	(6)
2011–2012	Aurora	32	(1)
2012	CD Olmedo	20	(3)
2013	Técnico Universitario		
2013–2014	Alumni de Villa María		
2014–2015	Argentino de Merlo		
2015–	Sportivo Patria	11	(1)
- * Club domestic league appearances and goals as of 18 May 2015

Fernando Sanjurjo (born 9 July 1982 in San Martín) is an Argentine football midfielder currently playing in Sportivo Patria.
