= Christos Naidos =

Greek footballer

Personal information
- Full name: Christos Naidos
- Date of birth: 24 December 1979 (age 46)
- Place of birth: Thessaloniki, Greece
- Height: 1.71 m (5 ft 7 in)
- Position: Defender

Team information
- Current team: Digenis Lakkomatos (manager)

Senior career*
| Years | Team | Apps | (Gls) |
| 1998–2000 | Poseidon Michaniona | | |
| 2001 | Apollon Kryas Vrysi | 5 | (1) |
| 2001–2003 | Agrotikos Asteras | | |
| 2004–2006 | Aris | 45 | (0) |
| 2007 | Messiniakos | 12 | (0) |
| 2007–2009 | Panetolikos | 24 | (1) |
| 2009–2010 | Pyrsos Grevena | 21 | (0) |
| 2010–2011 | Pontioi Katerini | 30 | (0) |
| 2011–2012 | Apollon Kalamarias | 11 | (0) |
- * Club domestic league appearances and goals

Christos Naidos (Greek: Χρήστος Νάιντος; born 24 December 1979) is a Greek football manager and former player.

== Career ==
Born in Thessaloniki, Naidos began playing football with Poseidon Michaniona. He joined Super League Greece side Aris from Agrotikos Asteras F.C. in January 2004.
