= Gilles Domoraud =

Ivorian footballer (born 1979)

Personal information
- Full name: Gilles Martin Domoraud Danon Otto
- Date of birth: 15 February 1979 (age 47)
- Place of birth: Man, Ivory Coast
- Height: 1.73 m (5 ft 8 in)
- Position: Defender

Youth career
- 1999–2000: Strasbourg

Senior career*
Years	Team	Apps	(Gls)
2000	Besançon	25	(0)
2001–2002	Apollon Kalamarias	35	(2)
2002	Kassandra	12	(1)
2003	PAS Giannina	14	(2)
2003–2004	Rouen	30	(1)
2004–2005	Panionios	21	(1)
2005–2006	Aris	29	(4)
2006–2007	PAS Giannina	21	(4)
2007–2008	Nea Salamis	18	(2)
2008	Nyon	4	(0)

International career
2003	Ivory Coast	4	(0)
- * Club domestic league appearances and goals

Gilles Martin Domoraud Danon Otto (born 15 February 1979) is an Ivorian former professional footballer who played as a defender.

== Club career ==
Born in Man, Ivory Coast, Domoraud spent most of his career in Greece, including a season with Panionios in the Super League Greece. Domoraud played in France for Besançon (National) and Rouen (Ligue 2) and he played a season in Greek Cyprus for Nea Salamis. In July 2008, he joined Nyon from the French-speaking region of Switzerland.

== International career ==
Domoraud made four appearances for the senior Ivory Coast national football team during 2003, including a 2004 African Cup of Nations qualifying match against South Africa on 22 June 2003.

== Personal life ==
He is the brother of Jean-Jacques and Cyril. He holds both Ivorian and French nationalities.
