= Ioakim Beniskos =

Greek footballer

Personal information
- Date of birth: 28 September 1981 (age 45)
- Place of birth: Thessaloniki, Greece
- Height: 1.96 m (6 ft 5 in)
- Position: Forward

Senior career*
Years	Team	Apps	(Gls)
2002–2005	Agrotikos Asteras		
2005–2006	Aris		
2006–2010	Ethnikos Asteras		
2010–2011	Thrasyvoulos		
2011	Ethnikos Asteras		
2011–2012	Odysseas Kordelio		
2012–2013	Lamia		
2013–2014	Naoussa		
2014–2015	Ethnikos Filippiada		
2015–2016	A.E. Alexandreia		
2015–2017	Diagoras Sevasti		
2017–2018	A.C.F. Alexandreia		
2018–2019	A.E. Karitsa		
2019–2021	Pierikos		
- * Club domestic league appearances and goals

Ioakim "Mimis" Beniskos (Greek: Ιωακείμ «Μίμης» Μπενίσκος; born 28 September 1981) is a retired Greek football striker. (Note: Ioakim Beniskos at WorldFootball.net)
