= Paulo Costa (footballer) =

Portuguese footballer

Personal information
- Full name: Paulo Sérgio Cardoso da Costa
- Date of birth: 5 December 1979 (age 46)
- Place of birth: Moita, Portugal
- Height: 1.79 m (5 ft 10 in)
- Position: Attacking midfielder

Youth career
- 1993–1994: CD Charneca
- 1994–1996: Odivelas
- 1996–1998: Sporting CP

Senior career*
Years	Team	Apps	(Gls)
1998–1999	Lourinhanense	27	(6)
1999–2000	Alverca	15	(1)
2000	Inter Milan	0	(0)
2000–2001	Reggina	25	(1)
2001–2005	Porto	10	(0)
2001–2002	Porto B	12	(7)
2002–2003	→ Venezia (loan)	20	(0)
2003–2004	→ Bordeaux (loan)	16	(0)
2004–2005	→ Gil Vicente (loan)	17	(0)
2005–2006	Bordeaux B		
2006–2007	Aris	42	(7)
2007	Aris Limassol	13	(2)
2008–2009	Anorthosis	25	(3)
2009	→ APOEL (loan)	5	(2)
2009	Levadiakos	10	(0)
2010	APOP	11	(1)
2010	Ermis	4	(0)
2011	Aris Limassol	12	(4)
Total		264	(34)

International career
1999–2000	Portugal U20	20	(5)
2000–2002	Portugal U21	20	(8)
Medal record
Men's football
Representing Portugal
UEFA European Under-17 Championship
Winner	1996 Austria
- * Club domestic league appearances and goals

Paulo Sérgio Cardoso da Costa (born 5 December 1979) is a Portuguese footballer who played as an attacking midfielder.

After playing professionally in Portugal, Italy, France and Greece, he finally moved to Cyprus in his mid-20s, spending his remaining career there.

He scored once from 42 Primeira Liga games over the course of three seasons, representing Alverca, Porto and Gil Vicente in the competition.

== Club career ==
Born in Moita, Setúbal District, Costa began playing as a senior at Sporting Clube Lourinhanense, Sporting Clube de Portugal's farm team. In 1999 he joined F.C. Alverca, rejoining another youth product of the Primeira Liga powerhouse, Marco Caneira.

In June 2000, both Costa and Caneira signed with Inter Milan, who bought the pair in a co-ownership deal with Reggina Calcio. Costa was sold for €2 million and, in June 2001, Reggina acquired him outright for €1,3 million and Inter bought back Caneira for an undisclosed fee; however, in July Costa was bought back from Reggina for €1,6 million and, in a continuing series of unassuming loans, then played with FC Porto (which also acquired 50% registration rights for €1,5 million), A.C. Venezia and FC Girondins de Bordeaux, rejoining former teammate Caneira in the latter (with the first and third clubs, he was often demoted to the reserves); he returned to Portugal for the 2004–05 season, joining Gil Vicente FC.

Costa joined Aris Thessaloniki F.C. from Greece in January 2006, with his new club starting the second division season in poor fashion but improving their game and results under Nikos Anastopoulos and eventually returning to the Super League, with the player contributing with 13 games; the following campaign he scored a career-best seven goals, with Aris overachieving for a final fourth place as he formed a successful offensive partnership with Koke.

In August 2007, Costa started a Cypriot adventure, as many Portuguese players in that timeframe years, by joining Aris Limassol FC. On 3 January 2008 he signed a three-and-a-half-year contract with another side in the country, Anorthosis Famagusta FC.

On 28 December 2008, continuing in Cyprus, Costa signed a six-month contract with APOEL FC, but had it mutually rescinded on 13 March of the following year. In August 2009 he returned to Greece and penned a two-year deal with Levadiakos FC, leaving the club in January 2010 and moving back to Cyprus, signing for one and a half years with domestic cup holders APOP Kinyras FC.

Costa moved to Ermis Aradippou for 2010–11, but was released shortly after. He finished the season with another team in the country, former club Aris Limassol, netting four goals as they returned to the top flight after one year.
