= Sergio Ponce (Argentine footballer) =

Argentine footballer

Personal information
- Full name: Sergio Daniel Ponce
- Date of birth: 9 January 1984 (age 42)
- Place of birth: San Martín, Argentina
- Height: 1.70 m (5 ft 7 in)
- Positions: Attacking midfielder; right winger

Team information
- Current team: Panthiraikos

Senior career*
Years	Team	Apps	(Gls)
2004–2010	Chacarita Juniors	55	(0)
2008–2009	→ Panthrakikos (loan)	25	(2)
2010–2011	Deportivo Morón	23	(2)
2011–2012	Panthrakikos	24	(1)
2012–2013	AEL	24	(6)
2013–2014	Olympiacos Volos	9	(1)
2014–2015	Paniliakos	9	(2)
2015	Panegialios	11	(4)
2016–	Panthiraikos		
- * Club domestic league appearances and goals as of 11 May 2015

Sergio Daniel Ponce (born 9 January 1984) is an Argentine footballer who currently plays for Panegialios in the Greek Football League as an attacking midfielder or winger.

== Career ==
Ponce began his professional playing career in 2004 with Chacarita Juniors in the Argentine 2nd division. Between 2008 and 2009 he was loaned to Greek side Panthrakikos F.C. He returned to play for Chacarita Juniors in 2009 after the club's promotion to the Primera División. Managers Player (Agente Jugador) Ms Marcos Garzia Argentine..
