= Dimitrios Karatziovalis =

Greek footballer

Personal information
- Full name: Dimitrios Karatziovalis
- Date of birth: 22 July 1975 (age 51)
- Place of birth: Greece
- Height: 1.80 m (5 ft 11 in)
- Position: Goalkeeper

Team information
- Current team: Chelidonia F.C.

Senior career*
Years	Team	Apps	(Gls)
1997–2000	Poseidon Nea Michaniona F.C.	38	(0)
2000–2001	Apollon Athens	0	(0)
2001–2003	Olympiacos Volos	37	(0)
2003–2005	Apollon Kalamarias	34	(0)
2005–2009	Aris	3	(0)
2009–2010	Doxa Drama	25	(0)
2010–2014	Apollon Kalamarias	56	(0)
2014–2015	Aris	13	(0)
2015–2018	Makedonikos F.C.	0	(0)
- A.E.N.Krinis
2018	Meliteas F.C.		
- * Club domestic league appearances and goals

Dimitrios Karatziovalis (Greek: Δημήτρης Καρατζιοβαλής; born 22 July 1975) is a Greek footballer who plays for Makedonikos F.C. as a goalkeeper.

== Career ==
Karatziovalis began his career playing for Propontida Neou Marmara where he first developed his skills. Then he played for Poseidon Nea Michaniona F.C., Apollon Smyrnis F.C., Olympiacos Volos, Apollon Kalamarias F.C. and Aris Thessaloniki F.C., where he stayed for four years.
