= Petros Passalis =

Greek footballer

Personal information
- Date of birth: 10 April 1974 (age 52)
- Place of birth: Giannitsa, Greece
- Height: 1.76 m (5 ft 9 1/2 in)
- Position: Midfielder

Senior career*
Years	Team	Apps	(Gls)
1991–1994	Edessaikos	74	(2)
1994–2001	Olympiacos	131	(2)
2001–2007	Aris	98	(1)
Total		303	(5)
- * Club domestic league appearances and goals

Petros Passalis (Greek: Πέτρος Πασσαλής) is a Greek former professional footballer who played as a defensive midfielder. He started his career at Edessaikos and transferred as a great talent at Olympiacos in 1994 where he starred for some years before joining Aris in 2001. He retired in 2007.

== Honours ==
=== Club ===
Olympiacos

- Alpha Ethniki: 1997, 1998, 1999, 2000, 2001
- Greek Cup: 1999

Edessaikos

- Balkans Cup: 1993
