= Lambros Skordas =

Greek businessman

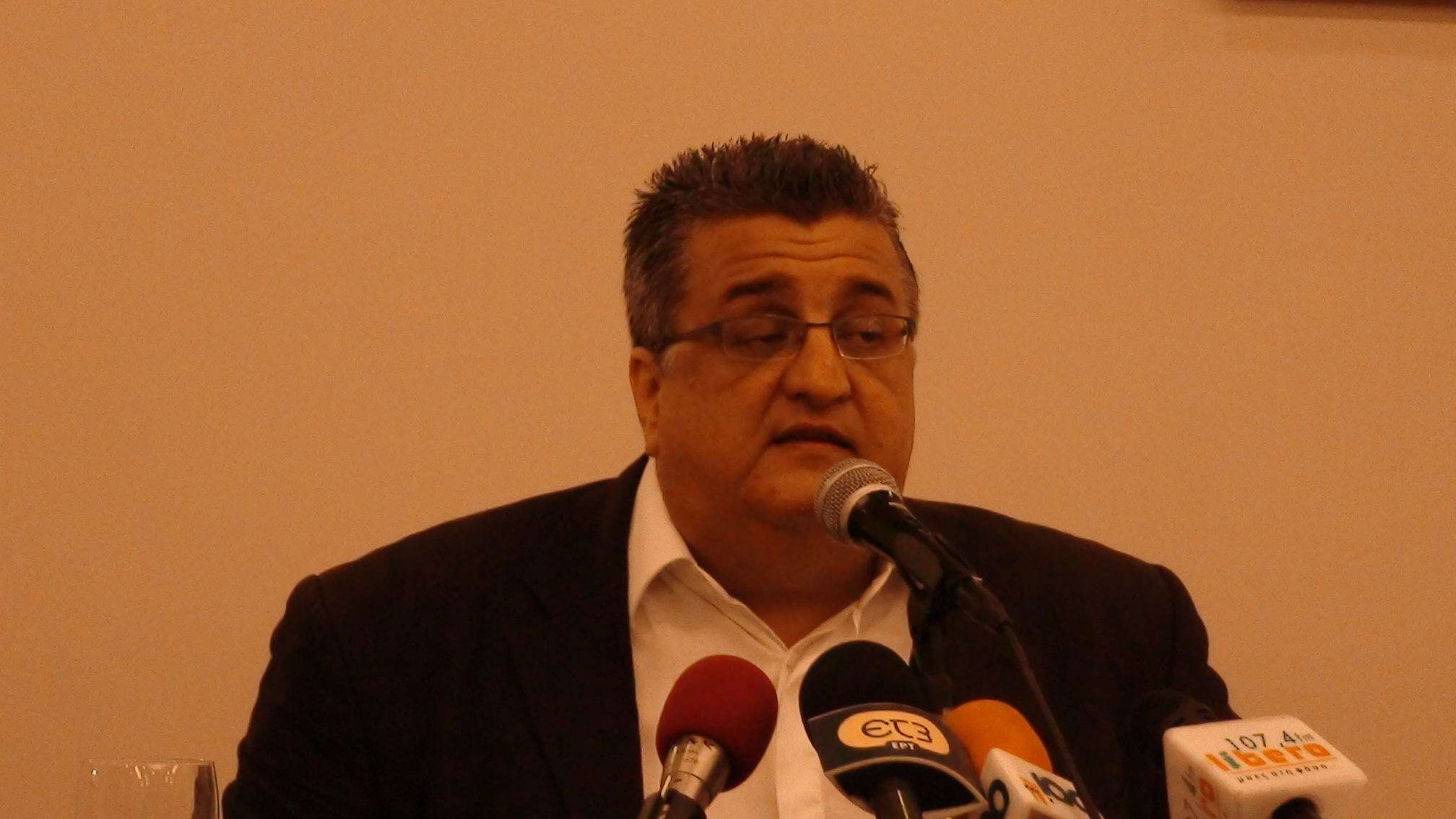
Lambros Skordas

Lambros Skordas (Greek: Λάμπρος Σκόρδας), a Doctor of Dental Surgery, is the former chairman of Aris Thessaloniki FC. He has been connected with the club's rise and financial reform in recent years.
