= Georgios Koltsidas =

Greek footballer

Personal information
- Full name: Georgios Koltsidas
- Date of birth: 23 September 1970 (age 56)
- Place of birth: Trikala, Greece
- Height: 1.88 m (6 ft 2 in)
- Position: Defender

Youth career
- 1986–1988: PO Fiki

Senior career*
Years	Team	Apps	(Gls)
1988–1992	Trikala	84	(1)
1992–1996	Aris	90	(2)
1996–1997	AEL	18	(1)
1997–2008	Aris	213	(7)
Total		405	(11)
- * Club domestic league appearances and goals

Georgios Koltsidas (Greek: Γεώργιος Κολτσίδας; born 23 September 1970) is a retired football player, who played as a defender and was known for his strong tackles. He is currently the general director of Aris.

He started his career with Trikala and joined Aris in July 1992, where he spent the majority of his career – except for a brief one-year spell at AEL. He retired at the end of the 2007–08 season.

He was a member of the Greece national under-21 football team which won the gold medal at the 1991 Mediterranean Games.
