= Liam Agnew =

English footballer (born 1995)

Personal information
- Full name: Liam John Agnew
- Date of birth: 11 April 1995 (age 31)
- Place of birth: Sunderland, England
- Height: 5 ft 10 in (1.78 m)
- Position: Midfielder

Youth career
- –2014: Sunderland

Senior career*
Years	Team	Apps	(Gls)
2014–2016	Sunderland	0	(0)
2014	→ Boston United (loan)	18	(2)
2016–2017	Boston United	8	(3)
2017–2020	Harrogate Town	46	(1)
2018	→ Boston United (loan)	2	(0)
2018–2019	→ York City (loan)	5	(0)
2019–2020	Gateshead	26	(0)
2020–2021	Blyth Spartans	7	(1)
- * Club domestic league appearances and goals as of 20:02, 24 September 2020 (UTC)

Liam John Agnew (born 11 April 1995) is an English professional footballer who plays as a midfielder.

Agnew started his career with Sunderland, progressing through the club's academy and having a period on loan with Boston United in the Conference North in early 2014. He made one first-team appearance for Sunderland in February 2015, against Fulham in the FA Cup. Agnew was released by Sunderland in 2016, and had a short period back at Boston United before signing for National League North club Harrogate Town in 2017. He was part of the team promoted to the National League in 2018. He played on loan at York City in the National League North from December 2018 to January 2019.

== Career ==
=== Sunderland ===
Agnew was born in Sunderland, Tyne and Wear. He started his career in Sunderland's Youth Academy. Agnew joined Conference North club Boston United on 10 January 2014 on loan with the team missing players through injury and suspension. He made his debut the next day, starting in a 4–2 away defeat to Hednesford Town. After extending his loan at Boston, Agnew scored in his second meeting against Hednesford on 1 March 2014, in a 4–0 win. After making 18 appearances and scoring 2 goals for Boston, Agnew returned to his parent club in May 2014.

Agnew signed his first professional contract at Sunderland in March 2014, of two years, contracting him to the club until June 2016. Whilst on loan at Boston, Agnew graduated to the first team-squad at Sunderland, and although he appeared as an unused substitute, this did not affect his loan at Boston. He made his debut for Sunderland on 4 February 2015, appearing as an 87th-minute substitute in a 3–1 FA Cup victory away to Fulham. Whilst in the reserve team, Agnew captained the under-21s. At the end of the 2015–16 season, Agnew was released by the club.

=== Boston United ===
Agnew signed for Boston United of the National League North in September 2016. He was expecting to join League One club Bradford City, having impressed manager Phil Parkinson on trial. However, the transfer did not happen, as Parkinson stated he remained unsure of offering Agnew a contract.

Agnew made his second Boston debut on 3 September 2016, where he scored again, in a 3–2 loss against F.C. United of Manchester. Since then, he became the club's captain. Agnew suggested that his non-contract agreement with Boston was close to being replaced by a permanent contract, which came after Lincoln City manager Danny Cowley denied rumours that he was interested in signing Agnew. The club's manager Dennis Greene was confident of Agnew signing a contract. He suffered a foot injury in October and missed the rest of the year.

=== Harrogate Town ===
Agnew signed for Boston's National League North rivals Harrogate Town on 26 January 2017. Having been an unused substitute on 4 February against his former club Boston, he made his debut on 11 February, coming on as an 81st-minute substitute in a 3–0 home win over Worcester City. He came on as a 90th-minute substitute on 13 May 2018 when Harrogate beat Brackley Town 3–0 at Wetherby Road in the National League North play-off final, which resulted in the club being promoted to the National League for the first time.

Agnew played regularly for Harrogate in the first few months of the 2018–19 season and signed a new contract with the club in October 2018, with manager Simon Weaver stating that his "performances have gone to another level recently". He re-joined National League North club Boston United on 23 November 2018 on a one-month loan, making his debut the following day when starting their 5–0 away win over Ashton United in the FA Trophy. He played regularly for Boston, although the club's attempts to extend his loan were unsuccessful. He joined another National League North club, York City, on 26 December on a one-month loan, making his debut the same day as a half-time substitute in a 5–1 defeat away to Darlington. He returned to Harrogate on 23 January 2019 having made five appearances for York.

== Career statistics ==
As of match played 19 January 2019

Appearances and goals by club, season and competition
Club	Season	League			FA Cup		League Cup		Other		Total	
Club	Season	Division	Apps	Goals	Apps	Goals	Apps	Goals	Apps	Goals	Apps	Goals
Sunderland	2013–14	Premier League	0	0	0	0	0	0	—		0	0
Sunderland	2014–15	Premier League	0	0	1	0	0	0	—		1	0
Sunderland	2015–16	Premier League	0	0	0	0	0	0	—		0	0
Sunderland	Total		0	0	1	0	0	0	—		1	0
Boston United (loan)	2013–14	Conference North	18	2	—		—		—		18	2
Boston United	2016–17	National League North	8	3	2	0	—		0	0	10	3
Boston United	Total		26	5	2	0	—		0	0	28	5
Harrogate Town	2016–17	National League North	10	0	—		—		—		10	0
Harrogate Town	2017–18	National League North	26	1	4	0	—		5 (Note: Four appearances in FA Trophy, one in National League North play-offs)	0	35	1
Harrogate Town	2018–19	National League	10	0	2	0	—		—		12	0
Harrogate Town	Total		46	1	6	0	—		5	0	57	1
Boston United (loan)	2018–19	National League North	2	0	—		—		2 (Note: Appearances in FA Trophy)	0	4	0
York City (loan)	2018–19	National League North	5	0	—		—		—		5	0
Career total			79	6	9	0	0	0	7	0	95	6

== Honours ==
Harrogate Town

- National League North play-offs: 2018
