= 2015–16 Sunderland A.F.C. season =

English football club season

Sunderland
2015–16 season
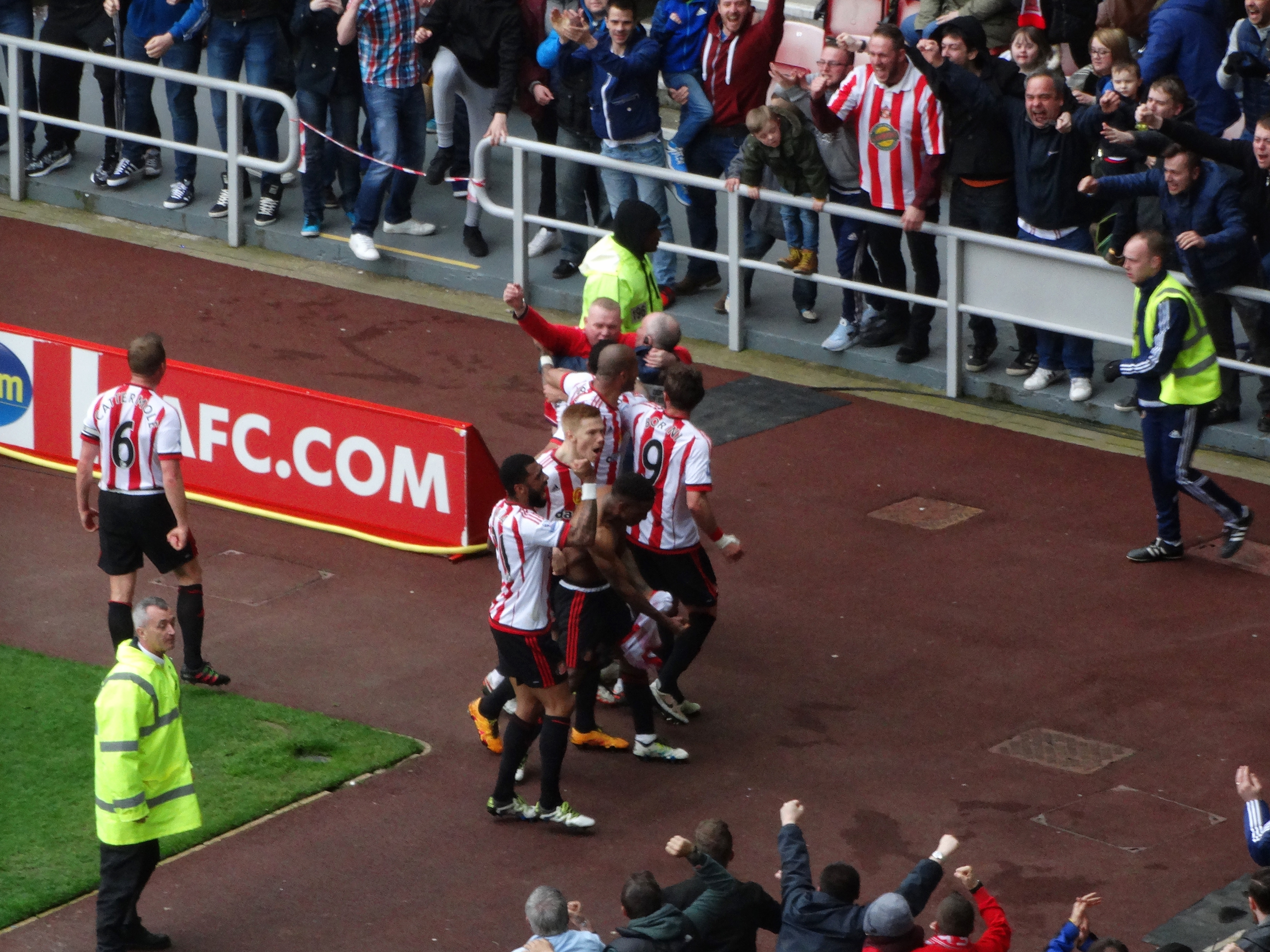
- Joyous Black Cats celebrate a goal at home to Chelsea, May 2016
- Chairman: Ellis Short
- Manager: Dick Advocaat (until 4 October 2015); Sam Allardyce (from 9 October 2015)
- Stadium: Stadium of Light
- Premier League: 17th
- FA Cup: Third round
- League Cup: Third round
- Top goalscorer: League: Jermain Defoe (15); All: Jermain Defoe (18)
Home colours	Away colours

The 2015–16 season is Sunderland's 137th season in existence, and their ninth consecutive season in the Premier League. Along with competing in the Premier League, the club also participated in the FA Cup and League Cup. The season covers the period from 1 July 2015 to 30 June 2016. On May 11 2016, Sunderland confirmed a tenth consecutive Premier League season with a 3–0 victory over Everton at the Stadium of Light. Simultaneously, the result confirmed the relegation of arch-rivals Newcastle.

== Squad ==
=== First Team Squad ===
Squad No.	Name	Nationality	Position (s)	Date of Birth (Age)	Signed from
Goalkeepers
13	Jordan Pickford	(England)	GK	7 March 1994 (age 32)	Academy
25	Vito Mannone	(Italy)	GK	2 March 1988 (age 38)	(England) Arsenal
33	Steve Harper	(England)	GK	14 March 1975 (age 51)	Free agent
Defenders
2	Billy Jones	(England)	RB	24 March 1987 (age 39)	(England) West Bromwich Albion
3	Patrick van Aanholt	(Netherlands)	LB	29 August 1990 (age 36)	(England) Chelsea
5	Wes Brown	(England)	CB	13 October 1979 (age 47)	(England) Manchester United
15	Younès Kaboul	(France)	CB	4 January 1986 (age 40)	(England) Tottenham Hotspur
16	John O'Shea (captain)	(Republic of Ireland)	CB	30 April 1981 (age 45)	(England) Manchester United
23	Lamine Koné	(Ivory Coast)	CB	1 February 1988 (age 38)	(France) Lorient
24	DeAndre Yedlin	(United States)	RB	9 July 1993 (age 33)	(England) Tottenham Hotspur (on loan)
34	Thomas Robson U21	(England)	LB	11 September 1995 (age 31)	(England) Darlington
Midfielders
6	Lee Cattermole (vice-captain)	(England)	DM	21 March 1988 (age 38)	(England) Wigan Athletic
7	Sebastian Larsson	(Sweden)	CM	6 June 1985 (age 41)	(England) Birmingham City
8	Jack Rodwell	(England)	CM	11 March 1991 (age 35)	(England) Manchester City
17	Jeremain Lens	(Netherlands)	LW	24 November 1987 (age 38)	(Ukraine) Dynamo Kyiv
20	Ola Toivonen	(Sweden)	AM	3 July 1986 (age 40)	(France) Rennes (on loan)
21	Yann M'Vila	(France)	DM	29 June 1990 (age 36)	(Russia) Rubin Kazan (on loan)
22	Wahbi Khazri	(Tunisia)	AM	8 February 1991 (age 35)	(France) Bordeaux
27	Jan Kirchhoff	(Germany)	DM	1 October 1990 (age 36)	(Germany) Bayern Munich
37	Rees Greenwood U21	(England)	LW	20 January 1996 (age 30)	Academy
39	George Honeyman U21	(England)	AM	8 September 1994 (age 32)	Academy
41	Duncan Watmore	(England)	RW	8 March 1994 (age 32)	(England) Altrincham
46	Lynden Gooch U21	(United States)	AM	24 December 1995 (age 30)	Academy
Forwards
9	Fabio Borini	(Italy)	ST	29 March 1991 (age 35)	(England) Liverpool
10	Dame N'Doye	(Senegal)	ST	21 February 1985 (age 30)	(Turkey) Trabzonspor (on loan)
18	Jermain Defoe	(England)	ST	7 October 1982 (age 44)	(Canada) Toronto

- U21 = Under-21 player

=== New contracts ===
No.	Pos	Player	Until	Source
5	Defender	(England) Wes Brown	June 2016	
6	Midfielder	(England) Lee Cattermole	June 2021	
41	Midfielder	(England) Duncan Watmore	June 2020	
13	Goalkeeper	(England) Jordan Pickford	June 2020	
39	Midfielder	(England) George Honeyman	June 2017	
46	Midfielder	(United States) Lynden Gooch	June 2019	

== Transfers and loans ==
=== Transfers in ===
First Team
Date from	Position	Nationality	Name	From	Fee	Ref.
1 Jul 2015	CB	URU	Sebastián Coates	(England) Liverpool	£2,000,000	
3 Jul 2015	RB	WAL	Adam Matthews	(Scotland) Celtic	£2,000,000	
15 Jul 2015	LW	NED	Jeremain Lens	(Ukraine) Dynamo Kyiv	£8,000,000	
16 Jul 2015	CB	FRA	Younès Kaboul	(England) Tottenham Hotspur	£3,000,000	
31 Aug 2015	ST	ITA	Fabio Borini	(England) Liverpool	£10,000,000	
7 Jan 2016	CB	GER	Jan Kirchhoff	(Germany) Bayern Munich	£750,000	
22 Jan 2016	GK	ENG	Steve Harper	Free agent	Free	
27 Jan 2016	CB	CIV	Lamine Koné	(France) Lorient	£5,000,000	
30 Jan 2016	AM	TUN	Wahbi Khazri	(France) Bordeaux	£9,000,000	
9 Mar 2016	RB	CIV	Emmanuel Eboué	Free agent	Free	

Total Spending: ▼£39,750,000

=== Loans in ===
First Team
Date from	Position	Nationality	Name	From	Date until	Ref.
6 Aug 2015	DM	FRA	Yann M'Vila	(Russia) Rubin Kazan	End of season	
28 Aug 2015	AM	SWE	Ola Toivonen	(France) Rennes	End of season	
1 Sep 2015	RB	USA	DeAndre Yedlin	(England) Tottenham Hotspur	End of season	
14 Jan 2016	ST	SEN	Dame N'Doye	(Turkey) Trabzonspor	End of season	

=== Transfers out ===
First Team
Date from	Position	Nationality	Name	To	Fee	Ref.
29 Jun 2015	DM	FRA	El Hadji Ba	(England) Charlton Athletic	£500,000	
30 Jun 2015	RB	FRA	Anthony Réveillère	Free agent	Released	
3 Aug 2015	ST	ENG	Connor Wickham	(England) Crystal Palace	£9,000,000	
19 Jan 2016	GK	ROM	Costel Pantilimon	(England) Watford	£6,000,000	
11 Feb 2016	RW	ENG	Adam Johnson	Free Agent	Sacked	
31 March 2016	RB	CIV	Emmanuel Eboué	Free Agent	Released	
5 May 2016	CB	FRA	Valentin Roberge	Free Agent	Released	

Total Received: ▲£15,500,000

=== Loans out ===
First Team
Date from	Position	Nationality	Name	To	Date until	Ref.
16 Jul 2015	CB	ARG	Santiago Vergini	(Spain) Getafe	End of season	
31 Jul 2015	GK	ENG	Jordan Pickford	(England) Preston North End	31 Dec 2015	
31 Aug 2015	AM	ITA	Emanuele Giaccherini	(Italy) Bologna	End of season	
2 Oct 2015	LW	ENG	Will Buckley	(England) Leeds United	26 Nov 2015	
15 Jan 2016	LW	ENG	Will Buckley	(England) Birmingham City	End of season	
26 Nov 2015	DM	SCO	Liam Bridcutt	(England) Leeds United	End of season	
20 Jan 2016	ST	ENG	Danny Graham	(England) Blackburn Rovers	End of season	
21 Jan 2016	AM	USA	Lynden Gooch U21	(England) Doncaster Rovers	Mar 21 2016	
27 Jan 2016	RW	GRE	Charalampos Mavrias	(Germany) Fortuna Düsseldorf	End of season	
28 Jan 2016	CB	URU	Sebastián Coates	(Portugal) Sporting CP	End of season	
31 Jan 2016	CM	ESP	Jordi Gomez	(England) Blackburn Rovers	End of season	
31 Jan 2016	ST	SCO	Steven Fletcher	(France) Marseille	End of season	
7 Mar 2016	RB	WAL	Adam Matthews	(England) Bristol City	End of season	

== Pre-season friendlies ==
On 26 May 2015, Sunderland announced two pre-season friendly against Darlington 1883 and Doncaster Rovers. On 5 June 2015, a tour of the United States and Canada was announced. On 23 June 2015, an exhibition match against Hannover 96 was announced to be played in Germany.

9 July 2015 Friendly	Darlington 1883	2–4	Sunderland	Bishop Auckland
19:45 BST	Thompson 8'; Mitchell 18'	Report	Giaccherini 23', 70'; Graham 53'; Wickham 62'	Stadium: Heritage Park

14 July 2015 Friendly	Sacramento Republic (United States)	1–0	Sunderland	Sacramento, United States
20:00 PDT	Iwasa 58'	Report		Stadium: Bonney Field

17 July 2015 Friendly	Pachuca (Mexico)	3–1	Sunderland	Sacramento, United States
19:30 PDT	Nahuelpán 16', 25'; Lozano 67'	Report	Rodwell 4'	Stadium: Bonney Field

22 July 2015 Friendly	Toronto (Canada)	1–2	Sunderland	Toronto, Canada
19:00 EDT	Osorio 46'	Report	Defoe 65', 69'	Stadium: BMO Field

29 July 2015 Friendly	Doncaster Rovers	2–0	Sunderland	Doncaster
19:45 BST	Evina 15'; Forrester 61'	Report		Stadium: Keepmoat Stadium

1 August 2015 Friendly	Hannover 96 (Germany)	0–1	Sunderland	Hanover, Germany
17:00 CET (UTC+2)		Report	Lens 75'	Stadium: HDI-Arena

== Competitions ==
=== Overall ===
Competition	Started round	Current position / round	Final position / round	First match	Last match
Premier League	—	—	17th	8 August 2015	15 May 2016
FA Cup	Third round	—	Third round	9 January 2016	9 January 2016
League Cup	Second round	—	Third round	25 August 2015	22 September 2015

Updated to match played 15 May 2016
Source: Competitions

=== Overview ===
Competition	Record							
Competition	G	W	D	L	GF	GA	GD	Win %
Premier League	38	9	12	17	48	62	−14	23.68
FA Cup	1	0	0	1	1	3	−2	0.00
League Cup	2	1	0	1	7	7	+0	50.00
Total	41	10	12	19	56	72	−16	24.39

Updated to match played 15 May 2016
Source: Competitions

=== Premier League ===
==== League table ====
Pos	Team	Pld	W	D	L	GF	GA	GD	Pts	Qualification or relegation
15	Crystal Palace	38	11	9	18	39	51	−12	42	
16	Bournemouth	38	11	9	18	45	67	−22	42	
17	Sunderland	38	9	12	17	48	62	−14	39	
18	Newcastle United (R)	38	9	10	19	44	65	−21	37	Relegation to EFL Championship
19	Norwich City (R)	38	9	7	22	39	67	−28	34	Relegation to EFL Championship

Source: Barclays Premier League
Rules for classification: 1) Points; 2) Goal difference; 3) Goals scored; 4) Play-offs (only if needed to decide champion, teams for relegation or teams for UEFA competitions).
(R) Relegated

==== Results summary ====
Overall								Home						Away					
Pld	W	D	L	GF	GA	GD	Pts	W	D	L	GF	GA	GD	W	D	L	GF	GA	GD
38	9	12	17	48	62	−14	39	6	6	7	23	20	+3	3	6	10	25	42	−17

Last updated: 15 May 2016.
Source: Premier League

==== Results by matchday ====
Matchday	1	2	3	4	5	6	7	8	9	10	11	12	13	14	15	16	17	18	19	20	21	22	23	24	25	26	27	28	29	30	31	32	33	34	35	36	37	38
Ground	A	H	H	A	H	A	A	H	A	H	A	H	A	H	A	H	A	A	H	H	A	A	H	H	A	H	A	H	A	A	H	H	A	H	A	H	H	A
Result	L	L	D	D	L	L	L	D	L	W	L	L	W	W	L	L	L	L	L	W	W	L	D	L	D	W	L	D	D	D	D	L	W	D	D	W	W	D
Position	19	20	20	20	19	20	20	19	20	18	19	19	18	17	19	19	19	19	19	19	18	19	19	19	19	19	19	17	17	18	18	18	18	17	17	17	17	17

Source: Statto.com
A = Away; H = Home; W = Win; D = Draw; L = Loss

==== Matches ====
On 17 June 2015, the fixtures for the forthcoming season were announced.

8 August 2015 1	Leicester City	4–2	Sunderland	Leicester
15:00 BST	Vardy 11' (yellow card) 49'; Mahrez 18', 25' (pen.); Albrighton 66'; Schlupp (yellow card) 90+1'	Report	Rodwell (yellow card) 17'; Jones (yellow card) 42'; Defoe 60'; Fletcher 71'; Kaboul (yellow card) 73'; Coates (yellow card) 85'	Stadium: King Power Stadium; Attendance: 32,242; Referee: Lee Mason

15 August 2015 2	Sunderland	1–3	Norwich City	Sunderland
15:00 BST	Lens (yellow card) 9'; Watmore 88'	Report	Bassong (yellow card) 7'; Martin 26'; Wthittaker 37'; Tettey (yellow card) 48'; Redmond 57'	Stadium: Stadium of Light; Attendance: 41,379; Referee: Kevin Friend

22 August 2015 3	Sunderland	1–1	Swansea City	Sunderland
15:00 BST	Lens (yellow card) 18'; Cattermole (yellow card) 21'; Coates (yellow card) 47'; Defoe 62' van Aanholt (yellow card) 82'	Report	Gomis 45+3'; Ayew (yellow card) 54'; Sigurðsson (yellow card) 90+2'	Stadium: Stadium of Light; Attendance: 39,198; Referee: Neil Swarbrick

29 August 2015 4	Aston Villa	2–2	Sunderland	Birmingham
15:00 BST	Sinclair 11' (pen.), 41'; Clark (yellow card) 37'; Gil (yellow card) 79'	Report	M'Vila 8'; Lens 52'; Pantilimon (yellow card) 90'	Stadium: Villa Park; Attendance: 35,399; Referee: Robert Madley

13 September 2015 5	Sunderland	0–1	Tottenham Hotspur	Sunderland
13:30 BST	Borini (yellow card) 21'; Jones (yellow card) 42'	Report	Vertonghen (yellow card) 16'; Mason 82'	Stadium: Stadium of Light; Attendance: 40,303; Referee: Craig Pawson

19 September 2015 6	AFC Bournemouth	2–0	Sunderland	Bournemouth
15:00 BST	Wilson 4'; Ritchie 9'; Gosling (yellow card) 80'; Murray (yellow card) 90+5'	Report	Coates (yellow card) 15'; Jones (yellow card) 24'; Kaboul (yellow card) 43' (yellow-red card) 74'; Borini (yellow card) 63'; Toivonen (yellow card) 85'	Stadium: Dean Court; Attendance: 11,271; Referee: Kevin Friend

26 September 2015 7	Manchester United	3–0	Sunderland	Manchester
15:00 BST	Depay 45+4'; Rooney 46'; Mata 90'	Report	Johnson (yellow card) 38'; Jones (yellow card) 50'; Cattermole (yellow card) 85'	Stadium: Old Trafford; Attendance: 75,328; Referee: Mike Jones

3 October 2015 8	Sunderland	2–2	West Ham United	Sunderland
15:00 BST	Fletcher 10'; Lens 22' (yellow card) 32' (yellow-red card) 56'; Cattermole (yellow card) 43'; Coates (yellow card) 74'	Report	Noble (yellow card) 2'; Reid (yellow card) 24'; Cresswell (yellow card) 36'; Jenkinson 45+1' (yellow card) 72'; Payet 60'	Stadium: Stadium of Light; Attendance: 42,932; Referee: Neil Swarbrick

17 October 2015 9	West Bromwich Albion	1–0	Sunderland	West Bromwich
15:00 BST	Dawson (yellow card) 9'; Berahino 54'; Yacob (yellow card) 56'	Report	Pantilimon (yellow card) 55'; Borini (yellow card) 84'	Stadium: The Hawthorns; Attendance: 24,225; Referee: Martin Atkinson

25 October 2015 10	Sunderland	3–0	Newcastle United	Sunderland
13:00 GMT	Johnson 45+3' (pen.); Jones 65'; Fletcher 86'	Report	Tioté (yellow card) 14'; Coloccini (red card) 45+1'; Colback (yellow card) 45+3'	Stadium: Stadium of Light; Attendance: 47,653; Referee: Robert Madley

1 November 2015 11	Everton	6–2	Sunderland	Liverpool
13:30 GMT	Deulofeu 19' (yellow card) 54'; Koné 31', 62', 76'; Stones (yellow card) 53'; Coates 55' (o.g.); Lukaku 60'; Galloway (yellow card) 90+1'	Report	Defoe (yellow card) 18' (goal) 45+4'; Fletcher 50'; Rodwell (yellow card) 58'	Stadium: Goodison Park; Attendance: 36,617; Referee: Andre Marriner

7 November 2015 12	Sunderland	0–1	Southampton	Sunderland
15:00 GMT	Johnson (yellow card) 44'	Report	Mané (yellow card) 12'; Tadić 69' (pen.); Bertrand (yellow card) 75'; Pellè (yellow card) 90'	Stadium: Stadium of Light; Attendance: 41,781; Referee: Mike Jones

23 November 2015 13	Crystal Palace	0–1	Sunderland	London
20:00 GMT	Dann (yellow card) 66'	Report	Jones (yellow card) 53'; M'Vila (yellow card) 67'; Defoe (yellow card) 57' (goal) 80'	Stadium: Selhurst Park; Attendance: 24,361; Referee: Martin Atkinson

28 November 2015 14	Sunderland	2–0	Stoke City	Sunderland
15:00 GMT	van Aanholt 82'; Watmore 84'	Report	Adam (yellow card) 33'; Shawcross (yellow card) 42' (yellow-red card) 47'; Pieters (yellow card) 81'	Stadium: Stadium of Light; Attendance: 41,516; Referee: Mike Dean

5 December 2015 15	Arsenal	3–1	Sunderland	London
15:00 GMT	Campbell 33'; Koscielny (yellow card) 44'; Giroud 63'; Ramsey 90+3'	Report	Giroud 45' (o.g.); Yedlin (yellow card) 80'	Stadium: Emirates Stadium; Attendance: 59,937; Referee: Robert Madley

12 December 2015 16	Sunderland	0–1	Watford	Sunderland
15:00 GMT	Rodwell (yellow card) 60'	Report	Ighalo 4'	Stadium: Stadium of Light; Attendance: 43,989; Referee: Graham Scott

19 December 2015 17	Chelsea	3–1	Sunderland	London
15:00 GMT	Ivanović 5'; Pedro 13'; Oscar 50' (pen.); Matić (yellow card) 88'	Report	Pantilimon (yellow card) 48'; Borini 53'; Rodwell (yellow card) 62'; O'Shea (yellow card) 89'	Stadium: Stamford Bridge; Attendance: 41,562; Referee: Roger East

26 December 2015 18	Manchester City	4–1	Sunderland	Manchester
15:00 GMT	Sterling (yellow card) 4', (goal) 12'; Touré 17'; Bony 22'; De Bruyne 54'	Report	Jones (yellow card) 36'; Borini 59'	Stadium: Etihad Stadium; Attendance: 54,523; Referee: Anthony Taylor

30 December 2015 19	Sunderland	0–1	Liverpool	Sunderland
19:45 GMT	Lens (yellow card) 86'	Report	Benteke (yellow card) 19' (goal) 46'; Can (yellow card) 58'; Moreno (yellow card) 77'	Stadium: Stadium of Light; Attendance: 45,765; Referee: Kevin Friend

2 January 2016 20	Sunderland	3–1	Aston Villa	Sunderland
15:00 GMT	Brown (yellow card) 26'; Richards 30' (o.g.); Borini (yellow card) 33'; Defoe 72', 90+2'; Cattermole (yellow card) 90+5'	Report	Hutton (yellow card) 43'; Gil 63' (yellow card) 87'; Traoré (yellow card) 69'; Gestede (yellow card) 90+5'	Stadium: Stadium of Light; Attendance: 41,535; Referee: Craig Pawson

13 January 2016 21	Swansea City	2–4	Sunderland	Swansea
19:45 GMT	Sigurðsson 21' (pen.); Naughton (red card) 37'; Ayew 40'	Report	Defoe 3', 61', 85'; Fernández 49' (o.g.) van Aanholt (yellow card) 79'; Mannone (yellow card) 67'	Stadium: Liberty Stadium; Attendance: 20,140; Referee: Graham Scott

16 January 2016 22	Tottenham Hotspur	4–1	Sunderland	London
12:45 GMT	Eriksen 42', 67'; Dembélé 60'; Kane 79' (pen.)	Report	van Aanholt 40'; Cattermole (yellow card) 46'; Johnson (yellow card) 55'	Stadium: White Hart Lane; Attendance: 35,854; Referee: Mike Dean

23 January 2016 23	Sunderland	1–1	AFC Bournemouth	Sunderland
15:00 GMT	van Aanholt 45+1'; Jones (yellow card) 89'	Report	Afobe 13'; Surman (yellow card) 18'	Stadium: Stadium of Light; Attendance: 41,367; Referee: Roger East

2 February 2016 24	Sunderland	0–1	Manchester City	Sunderland
19:45 GMT	Jones (yellow card) 59'	Report	Agüero 16', (yellow card) 90+1'; Otamendi (yellow card) 80'; Fernandinho (yellow card) 90+4'; Sagna (yellow card) 90+5'	Stadium: Stadium of Light; Attendance: 38,852; Referee: Stuart Attwell

6 February 2016 25	Liverpool	2–2	Sunderland	Liverpool
19:45 GMT	Firmino 59'; Lallana 70'; Moreno (yellow card) 81'	Report	N'Doye (yellow card) 39'; Johnson 82'; Defoe 89'	Stadium: Anfield; Attendance: 44,179; Referee: Robert Madley

13 February 2016 26	Sunderland	2–1	Manchester United	Sunderland
12:45 GMT	Khazri 3'; Yedlin (yellow card) 38'; O'Shea (yellow card) 45+1' de Gea 82' (o.g.)	Report	Martial 39'; Rooney (yellow card) 46'; Mata (yellow card) 58'; Carrick (yellow card) 59'	Stadium: Stadium of Light; Attendance: 41,687; Referee: Andre Marriner

27 February 2016 27	West Ham United	1–0	Sunderland	London
12:45 GMT	Antonio 30'; Byram (yellow card) 71'	Report		Stadium: Boleyn Ground; Attendance: 34,946; Referee: Mike Dean

1 March 2016 28	Sunderland	2–2	Crystal Palace	Sunderland
19:45 GMT	Rodwell (yellow card) 16'; N'Doye 36'; Borini 90'	Report	Dann (yellow card) 45+1'; Wickham 61', 67'	Stadium: Stadium of Light; Attendance: 39,795; Referee: Anthony Taylor

5 March 2016 29	Southampton	1–1	Sunderland	Southampton
15:00 GMT	Bertrand (yellow card) 8'; Fonte (red card) 79' van Dijk 90+3'	Report	Khazri (yellow card) 11'; Defoe 85'	Stadium: St Mary's Stadium; Attendance: 31,458; Referee: Neil Swarbrick

20 March 2016 30	Newcastle United	1–1	Sunderland	Newcastle upon Tyne
14:30 GMT	Colback (yellow card) 18'; Janmaat (yellow card) 36'; Shelvey (yellow card) 52'; Mitrovic 83' (yellow card) 84'	Report	Defoe 44'; Mannone (yellow card) 90'	Stadium: St James' Park; Attendance: 52,311; Referee: Martin Atkinson

2 April 2016 31	Sunderland	0–0	West Bromwich Albion	Sunderland
15:00 BST	Kaboul (yellow card) 18'	Report	Gardner (yellow card) 47'; Evans (yellow card) 88'	Stadium: Stadium of Light; Attendance: 45,144; Referee: Roger East

10 April 2016 32	Sunderland	0–2	Leicester City	Sunderland
13:30 BST	Borini (yellow card) 21'	Report	Fuchs (yellow card) 30'; Vardy 66', 90+5'	Stadium: Stadium of Light; Attendance: 46,531; Referee: Anthony Taylor

16 April 2016 33	Norwich City	0–3	Sunderland	Norwich
12:45 BST	Wisdom (yellow card) 40'; Olsson (yellow card) 59'	Report	Khazri (yellow card) 32'; Borini 41' (pen.); Defoe 53'; Cattermole (yellow card) 58'; Watmore 90+1'	Stadium: Carrow Road; Attendance: 27,117; Referee: Andre Marriner

24 April 2016 34	Sunderland	0–0	Arsenal	Sunderland
14:05 BST	Borini (yellow card) 58'; Khazri (yellow card) 90+3'	Report	Bellerín (yellow card) 49'; Elneny (yellow card) 76'; Koscielny (yellow card) 90+2'	Stadium: Stadium of Light; Attendance: 45,420; Referee: Mike Dean

30 April 2016 35	Stoke City	1–1	Sunderland	Stoke-on-Trent
15:00 BST	Arnautović 50'; Adam (yellow card) 75'; Imbula (yellow card) 83'	Report	N'Doye (yellow card) 79'; Larsson (yellow card) 90'; Defoe 90' (pen.)	Stadium: Britannia Stadium; Attendance: 27,667; Referee: Craig Pawson

7 May 2016 36	Sunderland	3–2	Chelsea	Sunderland
15:00 BST	Khazri 41'; Cattermole (yellow card) 52'; Borini 67'; Defoe 70' (yellow card) 70'; Kaboul (yellow card) 87'; Larsson (yellow card) 88'	Report	Cahill (yellow card) 1'; Costa 14'; Matić 45+3'; Terry (yellow card) 87' (yellow-red card) 90+5'	Stadium: Stadium of Light; Attendance: 47,050; Referee: Mike Jones

11 May 2016 37	Sunderland	3–0	Everton	Sunderland
19:45 BST	van Aanholt 38'; Koné 42', 55'; Cattermole (yellow card) 67'	Report		Stadium: Stadium of Light; Attendance: 46,454; Referee: Anthony Taylor

15 May 2016 38	Watford	2–2	Sunderland	Watford
15:00 BST	Prödl 48'; Deeney 61' (pen.); Guedioura (yellow card) 80'	Report	Rodwell 39'; Lens 51'	Stadium: Vicarage Road; Attendance: 21,012; Referee: Kevin Friend

=== Football League Cup ===
25 August 2015 Second round	Sunderland	6–3	Exeter City	Sunderland
19:45 BST	Rodwell 12', 64'; Defoe 16', 39', 87'; Watmore 78'	Report	Oyeleke 19'; Wheeler 31'; McCready 43'	Stadium: Stadium of Light; Attendance: 14,360; Referee: Stuart Attwell

22 September 2015 Third round	Sunderland	1–4	Manchester City	Sunderland
19:45 BST	Rodwell (yellow card) 15'; Coates (yellow card) 45+1'; Toivonen 83'	Report	Agüero 9' (pen.); De Bruyne 25'; Mannone 33' (o.g.); Sterling 36'; Demichelis (yellow card) 57'	Stadium: Stadium of Light; Attendance: 21,644; Referee: Roger East

=== FA Cup ===
9 January 2016 Third round	Arsenal	3–1	Sunderland	London
15:00 GMT	Campbell 25'; Ramsey 72'; Giroud 75'; Gabriel (yellow card) 90+3'	Report	Lens 17'	Stadium: Emirates Stadium; Attendance: 59,349; Referee: Martin Atkinson

== Statistics ==
=== Appearances and goals ===
As of 15 May 2016

No.	Pos	Nat	Player	Total		Premier League		FA Cup		League Cup	
No.	Pos	Nat	Player	Apps	Goals	Apps	Goals	Apps	Goals	Apps	Goals
2	DF	(England) ENG	Billy Jones	25	1	23+1	1	0+1	0	0	0
3	DF	(Netherlands) NED	Patrick van Aanholt	36	4	33	4	1	0	2	0
5	DF	(England) ENG	Wes Brown	6	0	6	0	0	0	0	0
6	MF	(England) ENG	Lee Cattermole	34	0	27+4	0	1	0	1+1	0
7	MF	(Sweden) SWE	Sebastian Larsson	19	0	6+12	0	0	0	1	0
8	MF	(England) ENG	Jack Rodwell	24	3	9+13	1	0	0	2	2
9	FW	(Italy) ITA	Fabio Borini	27	5	22+4	5	0	0	1	0
10	FW	(Senegal) SEN	Dame N'Doye	11	1	5+6	1	0	0	0	0
12	DF	(Wales) WAL	Adam Matthews	2	0	0+1	0	0	0	1	0
13	GK	(England) ENG	Jordan Pickford	3	0	2	0	1	0	0	0
15	DF	(France) FRA	Younès Kaboul	23	0	22+1	0	0	0	0	0
16	DF	(Republic of Ireland) IRL	John O'Shea	31	0	23+5	0	1	0	2	0
17	MF	(Netherlands) NED	Jeremain Lens	22	4	14+6	3	1	1	1	0
18	FW	(England) ENG	Jermain Defoe	34	18	28+5	15	0	0	1	3
20	MF	(Sweden) SWE	Ola Toivonen	14	1	9+3	0	1	0	1	1
21	MF	(France) FRA	Yann M'Vila	40	1	36+1	1	0+1	0	2	0
22	MF	(Tunisia) TUN	Wahbi Khazri	14	2	13+1	2	0	0	0	0
23	DF	(Ivory Coast) CIV	Lamine Koné	15	2	15	2	0	0	0	0
24	DF	(United States) USA	DeAndre Yedlin	25	0	21+2	0	1	0	1	0
25	GK	(Italy) ITA	Vito Mannone	20	0	19	0	0	0	1	0
27	DF	(Germany) GER	Jan Kirchhoff	15	0	14+1	0	0	0	0	0
29	DF	(France) FRA	Valentin Roberge	0	0	0	0	0	0	0	0
34	MF	(England) ENG	Thomas Robson	1	0	1	0	0	0	0	0
37	MF	(England) ENG	Rees Greenwood	1	0	1	0	0	0	0	0
39	MF	(England) ENG	George Honeyman	1	0	0+1	0	0	0	0	0
41	FW	(England) ENG	Duncan Watmore	25	4	7+16	3	1	0	0+1	1
46	FW	(United States) USA	Lynden Gooch	1	0	0	0	0	0	0+1	0
Players out on loan:
4	MF	(Scotland) SCO	Liam Bridcutt	0	0	0	0	0	0	0	0
14	MF	(Spain) ESP	Jordi Gómez	6	0	5+1	0	0	0	0	0
19	FW	(England) ENG	Danny Graham	12	0	4+6	0	1	0	1	0
22	DF	(Uruguay) URU	Sebastián Coates	19	0	14+2	0	1	0	2	0
23	MF	(Italy) ITA	Emanuele Giaccherini	0	0	0	0	0	0	0	0
26	FW	(Scotland) SCO	Steven Fletcher	18	4	11+5	4	1	0	0+1	0
27	DF	(Argentina) ARG	Santiago Vergini	0	0	0	0	0	0	0	0
28	MF	(Greece) GRE	Charalampos Mavrias	1	0	0	0	0+1	0	0	0
30	MF	(England) ENG	Will Buckley	0	0	0	0	0	0	0	0
Players no longer with club:
1	GK	(Romania) ROU	Costel Pantilimon	18	0	17	0	0	0	1	0
11	MF	(England) ENG	Adam Johnson	20	2	11+8	2	0	0	1	0

=== Goalscorers ===
As of 15 May 2016

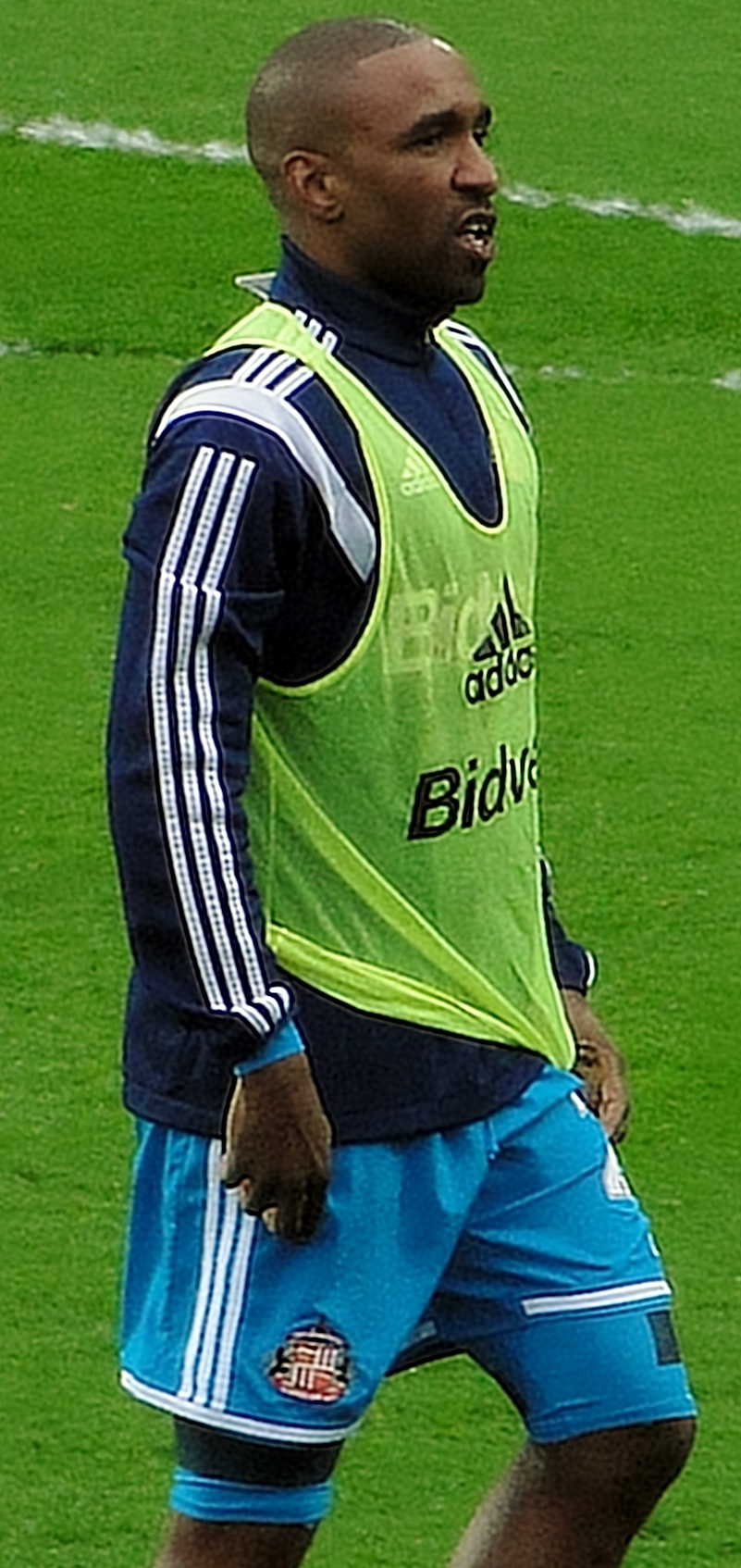
Jermain Defoe top-scored with eighteen goals.

Rank	No.	Nat.	Name	Premier League	FA Cup	League Cup	Total
1	18	(England)	Jermain Defoe	15	0	3	18
2	9	(Italy)	Fabio Borini	5	0	0	5
3	3	(Netherlands)	Patrick van Aanholt	4	0	0	4
3	17	(Netherlands)	Jeremain Lens	3	1	0	4
3	26	(Scotland)	Steven Fletcher	4	0	0	4
3	41	(England)	Duncan Watmore	3	0	1	4
7	8	(England)	Jack Rodwell	1	0	2	3
8	11	(England)	Adam Johnson	2	0	0	2
8	22	(Tunisia)	Wahbi Khazri	2	0	0	2
8	23	(Ivory Coast)	Lamine Koné	2	0	0	2
11	2	(England)	Billy Jones	1	0	0	1
11	10	(Senegal)	Dame N'Doye	1	0	0	1
11	20	(Sweden)	Ola Toivonen	0	0	1	1
11	21	(France)	Yann M'Vila	1	0	0	1
Own Goals				4	0	0	4
Total				44	1	7	52

=== Clean Sheets ===
Includes all competitive matches. The list is sorted alphabetically by surname when total clean sheets are equal.

Correct as of match played on 11 May 2016

No.	Nat.	Player	Matches Played	Clean Sheet %	Premier League	FA Cup	League Cup	TOTAL
25	(Italy)	Vito Mannone	20	20%	4	0	0	4
1	(Romania)	Costel Pantilimon	18	17%	3	0	0	3
13	(England)	Jordan Pickford	2	0%	0	0	0	0
Totals			40	18%	7	0	0	7

=== Disciplinary record ===
As of 11 May 2016

No.	Pos.	Name	Premier League			FA Cup			League Cup			Total		
No.	Pos.	Name	Yellow card	(yellow card) (yellow-red card)	Red card	Yellow card	(yellow card) (yellow-red card)	Red card	Yellow card	(yellow card) (yellow-red card)	Red card	Yellow card	(yellow card) (yellow-red card)	Red card
1	GK	Costel Pantilimon	3									3		
2	DF	Billy Jones	8									8		
3	DF	Patrick van Aanholt	2									2		
5	DF	Wes Brown	1									1		
6	MF	Lee Cattermole	8									8		
7	MF	Sebastian Larsson	2									2		
8	MF	Jack Rodwell	5						1			6		
9	FW	Fabio Borini	6									6		
10	FW	Dame N'Doye	2									2		
11	MF	Adam Johnson	3									3		
15	DF	Younès Kaboul	3	1								3	1	
16	DF	John O'Shea	2									2		
17	MF	Jeremain Lens	3	1								3	1	
18	FW	Jermain Defoe	2									2		
20	MF	Ola Toivonen	1									1		
20	MF	Yann M'Vila	1									1		
22	DF	Sebastián Coates	4						1			5		
22	MF	Wahbi Khazri	3									3		
24	DF	DeAndre Yedlin	2									2		
25	GK	Vito Mannone	2									2		
Total			63	2	0	0	0	0	2	0	0	65	2	0

== Overall summary ==
=== Summary ===
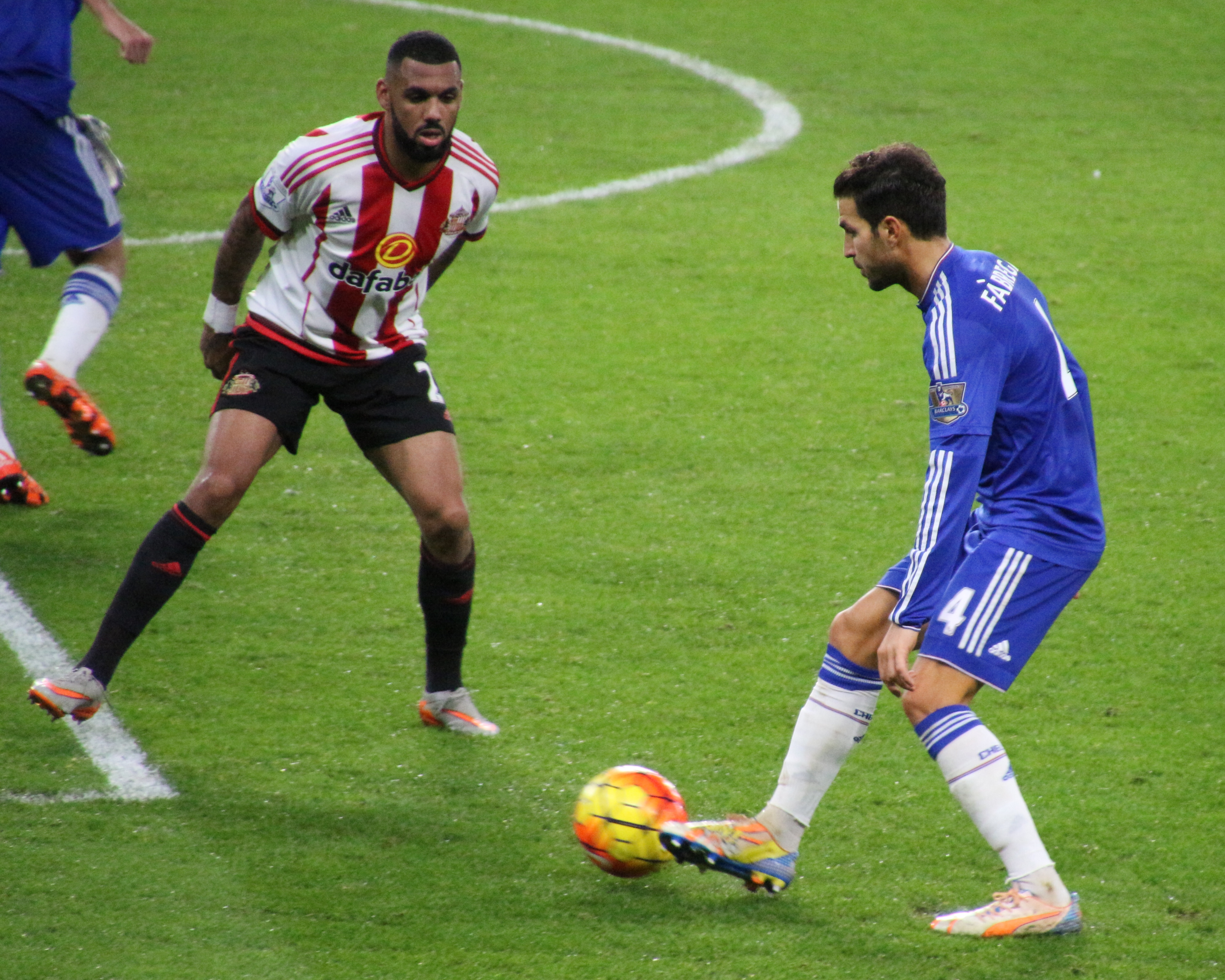
Yann M'Vila (left) made 37 appearances for Sunderland, more than anyone else.

Games played	40 (37 Premier League, 1 FA Cup, 2 League Cup)
Games won	10 (9 Premier League, 0 FA Cup, 1 League Cup)
Games drawn	11 (11 Premier League, 0 FA Cup, 0 League Cup)
Games lost	19 (17 Premier League, 1 FA Cup, 1 League Cup)
Goals scored	54 (46 Premier League, 1 FA Cup, 7 League Cup)
Goals conceded	70 (60 Premier League, 3 FA Cup, 7 League Cup)
Goal difference	-16 (-14 Premier League, -2 FA Cup, 0 League Cup)
Clean sheets	7 (7 Premier League, 0 FA Cup, 0 League Cup)
Yellow cards	52 (50 Premier League, 0 FA Cup, 2 League Cup)
Red cards	2 (2 Premier League, 0 FA Cup, 0 League Cup)
Worst discipline	Billy Jones (8 (yellow card) , 0 (red card) )
Best result	3–0 v. Newcastle United (H), 3–0 v. Everton (H)
Worst result	2–6 v. Everton (A)
Most appearances	Yann M'Vila (37)
Top scorer	Jermain Defoe (18)

=== Score overview ===
Opposition	Home score	Away score	Double
Arsenal	0–0	3–1	No
Aston Villa	3–1	2–2	No
Bournemouth	1–1	2–0	No
Chelsea	3–2	3–1	No
Crystal Palace	2–2	0–1	No
Everton	3–0	6–2	No
Leicester City	0–2	4–2	No
Liverpool	0–1	2–2	No
Manchester City	0–1	4–1	No
Manchester United	2–1	3–0	No
Newcastle United	3–0	1-1	No
Norwich City	1–3	0–3	No
Southampton	0–1	1–1	No
Stoke City	2–0	1–1	No
Swansea City	1–1	2–4	No
Tottenham Hotspur	0–1	4–1	No
Watford	0–1	2–2	No
West Bromwich Albion	0–0	1–0	No
West Ham United	2–2	0–1	No
