= Rees Greenwood =

English footballer

Personal information
- Full name: Rees Greenwood
- Date of birth: 10 December 1996 (age 29)
- Place of birth: Winlaton, England
- Height: 1.73 m (5 ft 8 in)
- Position: Winger

Team information
- Current team: Ryton & Crawcrook Albion

Youth career
- –2016: Sunderland

Senior career*
Years	Team	Apps	(Gls)
2016–2018	Sunderland	1	(0)
2018	Gateshead	8	(0)
2018	Falkirk	3	(1)
2019	Spennymoor Town	0	(0)
2019	→ West Auckland Town (loan)	6	(2)
2019–2020	West Auckland Town	10	(1)
2020–2021	Laval	2	(2)
2021–2022	ÍR	20	(2)
2022–	Ryton & Crawcrook Albion	0	(0)

International career
2016	England U20	2	(0)
- * Club domestic league appearances and goals as of 21:25, 21 March 2022 (UTC)

Rees Greenwood (born 10 December 1996) is an English footballer who plays as a winger for Ryton & Crawcrook Albion.

== Career ==
Born in Winlaton in Gateshead, Greenwood began his career with local side Sunderland. He joined the club at the age of eight and progressed through the youth teams, making his Premier League debut on 15 May 2016 in a 2–2 draw away at Watford. This proved to be his only appearance for the club and he joined Gateshead in January 2018.

Greenwood joined Falkirk in July 2018. He was released on 5 October 2018 after four appearances. He scored one goal for the club, against Partick Thistle on 4 August.

In the summer 2019, Greenwood joined Spennymoor Town. He was loaned out to West Auckland Town in August 2019 and later joined the club permanently on 1 October 2019.

In July 2020, Greenwood joined newly formed UAE Second Division League side Al-Sahel, who were later renamed Lavel United. He scored two and assisted two on his debut for Laval in a 7–0 win against FC Atletico Arabia in December 2020.

In March 2021, Greenwood moved to Iceland to join 2. deild karla side ÍR.

In March 2022, Greenwood joined Northern Football League side Ryton & Crawcrook Albion.

== Career statistics ==
As of match played 28 July 2018

Appearances and goals by club, season and competition
Club	Season	League			FA Cup		League Cup		Other		Total	
Club	Season	Division	Apps	Goals	Apps	Goals	Apps	Goals	Apps	Goals	Apps	Goals
Sunderland	2015–16	Premier League	1	0	0	0	0	0	0	0	1	0
Sunderland U-23	2016–17	Premier League 2	—						3 (Note: Appearances in EFL Trophy)	0	3	0
Sunderland U-23	2017–18	Premier League 2	—						3	1	3	1
Sunderland U-23	Total		0	0	0	0	0	0	6	1	6	1
Gateshead	2017–18	National League	8	0	0	0	0	0	0	0	8	0
Falkirk	2017–18	Scottish Championship	3	1	0	0	1	0	0	0	4	1
Career total			9	0	0	0	0	0	0	0	9	0
