= 2014–15 Sunderland A.F.C. season =

English football club season

Sunderland
2014–15 season
- Owner: Ellis Short
- Manager: Gus Poyet (until 16 March 2015); Dick Advocaat (from 17 March 2015)
- Stadium: Stadium of Light
- Premier League: 16th
- FA Cup: Fifth round
- League Cup: Third round
- Top goalscorer: League: Steven Fletcher; Connor Wickham (5 each); All: Jordi Gómez; Connor Wickham (6 each)
Home colours	Away colours	Third colours

The 2014–15 season is Sunderland's 8th consecutive season in the top division of English football, the Premier League.

== Players ==
As of 18 February 2015

Note: Flags indicate national team as defined under FIFA eligibility rules; some limited exceptions apply. Players may hold more than one non-FIFA nationality.

No.	Pos.	Nation	Player
1	GK	ROU	Costel Pantilimon
2	DF	ENG	Billy Jones
3	DF	NED	Patrick van Aanholt
4	MF	SCO	Liam Bridcutt
5	DF	ENG	Wes Brown
6	MF	ENG	Lee Cattermole
7	MF	SWE	Sebastian Larsson
8	MF	ENG	Jack Rodwell
9	FW	SCO	Steven Fletcher
10	FW	ENG	Connor Wickham
11	MF	ENG	Adam Johnson
14	MF	ESP	Jordi Gómez

No.	Pos.	Nation	Player
15	DF	FRA	Anthony Réveillère
16	DF	IRL	John O'Shea
17	FW	USA	Jozy Altidore
19	FW	ENG	Danny Graham
20	MF	ARG	Ricky Álvarez (on loan from Inter Milan)
22	DF	URU	Sebastián Coates (on loan from Liverpool)
23	MF	ITA	Emanuele Giaccherini
25	GK	ITA	Vito Mannone
27	DF	ARG	Santiago Vergini (on loan from Estudiantes)
28	FW	ENG	Jermain Defoe
30	MF	ENG	Will Buckley

=== Current reserve players with first-team appearances ===
Note: Flags indicate national team as defined under FIFA eligibility rules; some limited exceptions apply. Players may hold more than one non-FIFA nationality.

No.	Pos.	Nation	Player
38	FW	FRA	Mikael Mandron (at Shrewsbury Town until 30 June 2015)
39	MF	ENG	George Honeyman
42	MF	ENG	Liam Agnew

=== Out on loan ===
Note: Flags indicate national team as defined under FIFA eligibility rules; some limited exceptions apply. Players may hold more than one non-FIFA nationality.

No.	Pos.	Nation	Player
13	GK	ENG	Jordan Pickford (at Bradford City until 30 June 2015)
18	MF	GRE	Charalampos Mavrias (at Panathinaikos until 30 June 2015)
22	MF	FRA	El Hadji Ba (at Bastia until 30 June 2015)
29	DF	FRA	Valentin Roberge (at Reims until 30 June 2015)

== Transfers ==
=== In ===
Date	Pos.	Name	From	Fee	Ref.
28 May 2014	DF	Billy Jones (ENG)	West Bromwich Albion (ENG)	Free transfer	
29 May 2014	MF	Jordi Gómez (ESP)	Wigan Athletic (ENG)	Free transfer	
16 June 2014	GK	Costel Pantilimon (ROM)	Manchester City (ENG)	Free transfer	
25 July 2014	DF	Patrick van Aanholt (NED)	Chelsea (ENG)	Undisclosed	
5 August 2014	MF	Jack Rodwell (ENG)	Manchester City (ENG)	Undisclosed	
13 August 2014	MF	Will Buckley (ENG)	Brighton & Hove Albion (ENG)	Undisclosed	
23 October 2014	DF	Anthony Réveillère (FRA)	Napoli (ITA)	Free transfer	
16 January 2015	FW	Jermain Defoe (ENG)	Toronto FC (CAN)	Undisclosed	

=== Loans in ===
Date from	Date until	Pos.	Name	From	Ref.
7 August 2014	30 June 2015	DF	Santiago Vergini (ARG)	Estudiantes (ARG)	
1 September 2014	30 June 2015	DF	Sebastián Coates (URU)	Liverpool (ENG)	
1 September 2014	30 June 2015	MF	Ricky Álvarez (ARG)	Inter Milan (ITA)	

=== Out ===
Date	Pos.	Name	To	Fee	Ref.
20 May 2014	MF	Craig Gardner (ENG)	West Bromwich Albion (ENG)	Free transfer	
22 May 2014	DF	Phil Bardsley (SCO)	Stoke City (ENG)	Free transfer	
23 May 2014	DF	Carlos Cuéllar (ESP)	Norwich City (ENG)	Released	
23 May 2014	DF	Andrea Dossena (ITA)	Leyton Orient (ENG)	Released	
23 May 2014	DF	Louis Laing (ENG)	Nottingham Forest (ENG)	Released	
23 May 2014	GK	Óscar Ustari (ARG)	Newell's Old Boys (ARG)	Released	
23 May 2014	MF	David Vaughan (WAL)	Nottingham Forest (ENG)	Released	
23 May 2014	DF	Jordan Watson (NIR)	Blyth Spartans (ENG)	Released	
23 May 2014	GK	Kieran Westwood (IRL)	Sheffield Wednesday (ENG)	Released	
23 May 2014	MF	Billy Knott (ENG)	Bradford City (ENG)	Released	
23 May 2014	DF	John Egan (IRL)	Gillingham (ENG)	Released	
9 June 2014	MF	Jack Colback (ENG)	Newcastle United (ENG)	Free transfer	
24 July 2014	FW	Ignacio Scocco (ARG)	Newell's Old Boys (ARG)	£2.4 million	
13 August 2014	MF	David Moberg Karlsson (SWE)	Nordsjælland (DEN)	Undisclosed	
22 August 2014	MF	Alfred N'Diaye (SEN)	Real Betis (ESP)	£2 million	
9 January 2015	DF	David Ferguson (ENG)	Blackpool (ENG)	Undisclosed	
9 January 2015	DF	Connor Oliver (ENG)	Blackpool (ENG)	Undisclosed	
16 January 2015	FW	Jozy Altidore (USA)	Toronto FC (CAN)	Undisclosed	
2 February 2015	DF	Scott Harrison (ENG)	Hartlepool United (ENG)	Undisclosed	
2 February 2015	MF	Cabral (SUI)	Free agent	Released	

=== Loans out ===
Date from	Date until	Pos.	Name	To	Ref.
21 July 2014	9 March 2015	GK	Jordan Pickford (ENG)	Bradford City (ENG)	
7 August 2014	30 June 2015	MF	El Hadji Ba (FRA)	Bastia (FRA)	
8 August 2014	8 September 2014	GK	Joel Dixon (ENG)	Hartlepool United (ENG)	
22 August 2014	22 September 2014	DF	Scott Harrison (ENG)	Hartlepool United (ENG)	
1 September 2014	30 June 2015	DF	Valentin Roberge (FRA)	Reims (FRA)	
31 October 2014	17 February 2015	GK	Joel Dixon (ENG)	Boston United (ENG)	
14 November 2014	31 December 2014	FW	Danny Graham (ENG)	Wolverhampton Wanderers (ENG)	
3 January 2015	2 February 2015	DF	Scott Harrison (ENG)	Hartlepool United (ENG)	
17 January 2015	17 February 2015	DF	Tom McNamee (ENG)	Boston United (ENG)	
28 January 2015	30 June 2015	FW	Mikael Mandron (FRA)	Shrewsbury Town (ENG)	
2 February 2015	30 June 2015	MF	Charalampos Mavrias (GRE)	Panathinaikos (GRE)	
23 February 2015	30 June 2015	GK	Max Stryjek (POL)	Boston United (ENG)	
27 February 2015	27 March 2015	MF	Lynden Gooch (USA)	Gateshead (ENG)	
24 March 2015	30 June 2015	GK	Joel Dixon (ENG)	Gateshead (ENG)	

== Statistics ==
=== Appearances and goals ===
As of 24 May 2015

No.	Pos	Nat	Player	Total		Premier League		FA Cup		League Cup	
No.	Pos	Nat	Player	Apps	Goals	Apps	Goals	Apps	Goals	Apps	Goals
1	GK	(Romania) ROU	Costel Pantilimon	31	0	28	0	1	0	2	0
2	DF	(England) ENG	Billy Jones	18	0	14	0	2	0	2	0
3	DF	(Netherlands) NED	Patrick van Aanholt	33	1	26+2	0	4	1	0+1	0
4	MF	(Scotland) SCO	Liam Bridcutt	24	0	10+8	0	4	0	2	0
5	DF	(England) ENG	Wes Brown	28	0	23+2	0	1+1	0	1	0
6	MF	(England) ENG	Lee Cattermole	27	1	26+1	1	0	0	0	0
7	MF	(Sweden) SWE	Sebastian Larsson	40	3	36	3	2+1	0	1	0
8	MF	(England) ENG	Jack Rodwell	26	3	17+6	3	2	0	1	0
9	FW	(Scotland) SCO	Steven Fletcher	33	5	20+9	5	4	0	0	0
10	FW	(England) ENG	Connor Wickham	40	6	31+5	5	0+3	0	1	1
11	MF	(England) ENG	Adam Johnson	34	5	23+7	4	1+1	0	2	1
14	MF	(Spain) ESP	Jordi Gómez	33	6	22+7	4	2	1	2	1
15	DF	(France) FRA	Anthony Réveillère	17	0	15+1	0	1	0	0	0
16	DF	(Republic of Ireland) IRL	John O'Shea	43	0	37	0	4	0	2	0
19	FW	(England) ENG	Danny Graham	17	1	7+7	1	1+1	0	0+1	0
20	MF	(Argentina) ARG	Ricky Álvarez	17	1	5+8	0	3	1	0+1	0
22	DF	(Uruguay) URU	Sebastián Coates	13	0	9+1	0	2	0	1	0
23	MF	(Italy) ITA	Emanuele Giaccherini	11	0	2+6	0	2	0	0+1	0
25	GK	(Italy) ITA	Vito Mannone	13	0	10	0	3	0	0	0
27	DF	(Argentina) ARG	Santiago Vergini	37	0	28+3	0	3+1	0	2	0
28	FW	(England) ENG	Jermain Defoe	19	4	17	4	2	0	0	0
30	MF	(England) ENG	Will Buckley	23	0	9+12	0	0+1	0	1	0
39	MF	(England) ENG	George Honeyman	1	0	0	0	0+1	0	0	0
42	MF	(England) ENG	Liam Agnew	1	0	0	0	0+1	0	0	0
Players out on loan:
13	GK	(England) ENG	Jordan Pickford	0	0	0	0	0	0	0	0
18	MF	(Greece) GRE	Charalampos Mavrias	0	0	0	0	0	0	0	0
22	MF	(France) FRA	El Hadji Ba	0	0	0	0	0	0	0	0
29	DF	(France) FRA	Valentin Roberge	1	0	1	0	0	0	0	0
38	FW	(France) FRA	Mikael Mandron	1	0	0+1	0	0	0	0	0
Players no longer with club:
12	MF	(Switzerland) SUI	Cabral	0	0	0	0	0	0	0	0
17	FW	(United States) USA	Jozy Altidore	13	1	2+9	0	0	0	2	1

=== Goalscorers ===
As of 24 May 2015

Rank	No.	Nat.	Name	Premier League	FA Cup	League Cup	Total
1	10	(England)	Connor Wickham	5	0	1	6
1	14	(Spain)	Jordi Gómez	4	1	1	6
3	9	(Scotland)	Steven Fletcher	5	0	0	5
3	11	(England)	Adam Johnson	4	0	1	5
5	28	(England)	Jermain Defoe	4	0	0	4
6	7	(Sweden)	Sebastian Larsson	3	0	0	3
6	8	(England)	Jack Rodwell	3	0	0	3
8	Own Goals			1	1	0	2
9	3	(Netherlands)	Patrick van Aanholt	0	1	0	1
9	6	(England)	Lee Cattermole	1	0	0	1
9	17	(United States)	Jozy Altidore	0	0	1	1
9	19	(England)	Danny Graham	1	0	0	1
9	20	(Argentina)	Ricky Álvarez	0	1	0	1
Total				31	4	4	39

=== Clean sheets ===
As of 24 May 2015

Rank	No.	Nat.	Name	Premier League	FA Cup	League Cup	Total
1	1	(Romania)	Costel Pantilimon	11	1	1	13
2	25	(Italy)	Vito Mannone	2	1	0	3
Total				13	2	1	16

=== Disciplinary record ===
As of 24 May 2015

No.	Pos.	Name	Premier League			FA Cup			League Cup			Total		
No.	Pos.	Name	Booked	(yellow card) (yellow-red card)	Sent off (straight red)	Booked	(yellow card) (yellow-red card)	Sent off (straight red)	Booked	(yellow card) (yellow-red card)	Sent off (straight red)	Booked	(yellow card) (yellow-red card)	Sent off (straight red)
1	GK	Costel Pantilimon	2	0	0	0	0	0	0	0	0	2	0	0
2	DF	Billy Jones	7	0	0	1	0	0	0	0	0	8	0	0
3	DF	Patrick van Aanholt	4	0	0	0	0	0	0	0	0	4	0	0
4	MF	Liam Bridcutt	6	1	0	2	0	0	1	0	0	9	1	0
5	DF	Wes Brown	5	0	1	0	0	0	0	0	0	5	0	1
6	MF	Lee Cattermole	14	0	0	0	0	0	0	0	0	14	0	0
7	MF	Sebastian Larsson	11	0	0	1	0	0	0	0	0	12	0	0
8	MF	Jack Rodwell	5	0	0	0	1	0	1	0	0	6	1	0
9	FW	Steven Fletcher	4	0	0	1	0	0	0	0	0	5	0	0
10	FW	Connor Wickham	8	0	0	0	0	0	0	0	0	8	0	0
11	MF	Adam Johnson	2	0	0	0	0	0	0	0	0	2	0	0
14	MF	Jordi Gómez	7	0	0	0	0	0	0	0	0	7	0	0
16	DF	John O'Shea	4	0	0	0	0	0	1	0	0	5	0	0
17	FW	Jozy Altidore	0	0	0	0	0	0	1	0	0	1	0	0
20	MF	Ricky Álvarez	3	0	0	1	0	0	0	0	0	4	0	0
22	DF	Sebastián Coates	0	0	0	1	0	0	0	0	0	1	0	0
23	MF	Emanuele Giaccherini	2	0	0	1	0	0	0	0	0	3	0	0
27	DF	Santiago Vergini	6	0	0	0	0	0	0	0	0	6	0	0
28	FW	Jermain Defoe	1	0	0	0	0	0	0	0	0	1	0	0
29	DF	Valentin Roberge	1	0	0	0	0	0	0	0	0	1	0	0
30	MF	Will Buckley	2	0	0	1	0	0	0	0	0	3	0	0
Total			94	1	1	9	1	0	4	0	0	107	2	1

== Match details ==
=== Pre-season and friendlies ===
19 July 2014	Darlington 1883	1–5	Sunderland	Bishop Auckland, England
15:00 BST	Brown 78'	Report	Fletcher 10', 20'; Giaccherini 55'; Wickham 77'; Gómez 87'	Stadium: Heritage Park; Attendance: 2,000 (1,000 Sunderland Fans)

22 July 2014	Carlisle United	0–1	Sunderland	Carlisle, England
19:30 BST		Report	Mandron 72'	Stadium: Brunton Park; Attendance: 3,586 (1,212 Sunderland Fans)

23 July 2014	Hartlepool United	0–3	Sunderland	Hartlepool, England
19:30 BST		Report	Lawson 70'; Cartwright 72', 78'	Stadium: Victoria Park; Attendance: 5,617 (3,252 Sunderland Fans)

29 July 2014	Recreativo Huelva (Spain)	0–1	Sunderland	Albufeira, Portugal
20:00 BST		Report	Mandron 78' (pen.)	Stadium: Estadio Municipal de Albufeira

30 July 2014	Nacional (Portugal)	1–0	Sunderland	Albufeira, Portugal
20:00 BST	Lucas 89'	Report		Stadium: Estadio Municipal de Albufeira

2 August 2014	Vitória de Setúbal (Portugal)	0–0	Sunderland	Albufeira, Portugal
20:00 BST		Report		Stadium: Estadio Municipal de Albufeira

7 August 2014	Sunderland	2–0	Real Betis (Spain)	Bishop Auckland, England
19:30 BST	Fletcher 79'; Wickham 81'	Report		Stadium: Heritage Park

9 August 2014	Sunderland	2–0	Udinese (Italy)	Bishop Auckland, England
15:00 BST	Vergini 57'; Wickham 58' (pen.)	Report		Stadium: Heritage Park

=== Premier League ===
==== League table ====
Pos	Team	Pld	W	D	L	GF	GA	GD	Pts	Qualification or relegation
14	Leicester City	38	11	8	19	46	55	−9	41	
15	Newcastle United	38	10	9	19	40	63	−23	39	
16	Sunderland	38	7	17	14	31	53	−22	38	
17	Aston Villa	38	10	8	20	31	57	−26	38	
18	Hull City (R)	38	8	11	19	33	51	−18	35	Relegation to Football League Championship

Source: Barclays Premier League
Rules for classification: 1) Points; 2) Goal difference; 3) Goals scored; 4) Play-offs (only if needed to decide champion, teams for relegation or teams for UEFA competitions).
(R) Relegated

==== Results summary ====
Overall								Home						Away					
Pld	W	D	L	GF	GA	GD	Pts	W	D	L	GF	GA	GD	W	D	L	GF	GA	GD
38	7	17	14	31	53	−22	38	4	8	7	16	27	−11	3	9	7	15	26	−11

Last updated: 24 May 2015.
Source: Premier League

==== Results by matchday ====
Matchday	1	2	3	4	5	6	7	8	9	10	11	12	13	14	15	16	17	18	19	20	21	22	23	24	25	26	27	28	29	30	31	32	33	34	35	36	37	38
Ground	A	H	A	H	A	H	H	A	H	A	H	A	H	H	A	H	A	H	A	A	H	A	H	A	H	H	A	A	H	A	H	H	A	H	A	H	A	A
Result	D	D	L	D	D	D	W	L	L	W	D	D	D	L	D	D	W	L	D	L	L	L	W	D	L	D	L	D	L	L	W	L	D	W	W	D	D	L
Position	6	11	13	13	15	15	11	17	17	15	14	14	13	14	14	15	14	14	14	14	16	16	14	14	14	16	16	16	17	17	15	16	18	18	16	16	15	16

Source: Statto.com
A = Away; H = Home; W = Win; D = Draw; L = Loss

==== Matches ====
The fixtures for the 2014–15 season were announced on 18 June 2014 at 9am.

16 August 2014 1	West Bromwich Albion	2–2	Sunderland	West Bromwich
15:00	Dawson (yellow card) 10'; Dorrans (yellow card) 30'; Olsson (yellow card) 32'; Berahino 42' (pen.), 74'	Report	Cattermole 5'; Roberge (yellow card) 42'; Larsson 85'	Stadium: The Hawthorns; Attendance: 25,468 (2,700 away fans); Referee: Neil Swarbrick

24 August 2014 2	Sunderland	1–1	Manchester United	Sunderland
16:00	Rodwell 30'	Report	Mata 17'; Young (yellow card) 62'; Cleverley (yellow card) 67'	Stadium: Stadium of Light; Attendance: 43,217; Referee: Martin Atkinson

30 August 2014 3	Queens Park Rangers	1–0	Sunderland	London
15:00	Austin 45+2'; Mutch (yellow card) 57'	Report	Cattermole (yellow card) 37'; Giaccherini (yellow card) 90+2'	Stadium: Loftus Road; Attendance: 17,930 (1,772 away fans); Referee: Robert Madley

13 September 2014 4	Sunderland	2–2	Tottenham Hotspur	Sunderland
15:00	Johnson 4'; Kane 82' (o.g.); Van Aanholt (yellow card) 85'; Vergini (yellow card) 88'; Wickham (yellow card) 90'; Gómez (yellow card) 90+3'; Brown (yellow card) 90+5'	Report	Chadli 2'; Eriksen 48'; Dier (yellow card) 61'	Stadium: Stadium of Light; Attendance: 40,799; Referee: Craig Pawson

20 September 2014 5	Burnley	0–0	Sunderland	Burnley
15:00	Marney (yellow card) 90'	Report	Rodwell (yellow card) 62'; O'Shea (yellow card) 78'	Stadium: Turf Moor; Attendance: 20,026 (4,108 away fans ) Referee: Anthony Taylor

27 September 2014 6	Sunderland	0–0	Swansea City	Sunderland
15:00	Cattermole (yellow card) 44'; Jones (yellow card) 75'	Report	Williams (yellow card) 50'; Rangel (yellow card) 60' (yellow-red card) 81'	Stadium: Stadium of Light; Attendance: 41,325; Referee: Chris Foy

4 October 2014 7	Sunderland	3–1	Stoke City	Sunderland
15:00	Wickham 4'; Fletcher 27', 79' (yellow card) 70'; Jones (yellow card) 64'; Van Aanholt (yellow card) 67'	Report	Adam 15'; Muniesa (yellow card) 27'; Assaidi (yellow card) 62'; Bardsley (yellow card) 66'; Bojan (yellow card) 90+1'	Stadium: Stadium of Light; Attendance: 42,713; Referee: Neil Swarbrick

18 October 2014 8	Southampton	8–0	Sunderland	Southampton
15:00	Vergini 12' (o.g.); Pellè 18', 69'; Cork 37'; Schneiderlin (yellow card) 50'; Bridcutt 63' (o.g.); Tadić 78'; Wanyama 79'; Van Aanholt 86' (o.g.)	Report	Wickham (yellow card) 9'; Cattermole (yellow card) 25'; Bridcutt (yellow card) 82'	Stadium: St Mary's Stadium; Attendance: 29,615 (2,559 away fans); Referee: Andre Marriner

25 October 2014 9	Sunderland	0–2	Arsenal	Sunderland
15:00	Larsson (yellow card) 38'; Cattermole (yellow card) 63'; Wickham (yellow card) 68'	Report	Gibbs (yellow card) 24'; Sánchez 30' 90+2'; Welbeck (yellow card) 50'; Arteta (yellow card) 55'	Stadium: Stadium of Light; Attendance: 44,449; Referee: Kevin Friend

3 November 2014 10	Crystal Palace	1–3	Sunderland	London
20:00	Brown 55' (o.g.); Jedinak (yellow card) 65' (yellow-red card) 87'	Report	Fletcher 31', 90+5'; Buckley (yellow card) 63'; Pantilimon (yellow card) 71'; Cattermole (yellow card) 74'; Gómez 79'	Stadium: Selhurst Park; Attendance: 23,212 (2,213 away fans); Referee: Phil Dowd

9 November 2014 11	Sunderland	1–1	Everton	Sunderland
13:30	Gómez (yellow card) 11'; Larsson 67'	Report	McCarthy (yellow card) 30'; McGeady (yellow card) 57'; Baines 76' (pen.)	Stadium: Stadium of Light; Attendance: 43,476; Referee: Lee Mason

22 November 2014 12	Leicester City	0–0	Sunderland	Leicester
15:00	Vardy (yellow card) 53'; De Laet (yellow card) 85'	Report	Larsson (yellow card) 42'; Cattermole (yellow card) 61'; Fletcher (yellow card) 68'	Stadium: King Power Stadium; Attendance: 31,825 (3,284 away fans); Referee: Robert Madley

29 November 2014 13	Sunderland	0–0	Chelsea	Sunderland
17:30	O'Shea (yellow card) 76'; Vergini (yellow card) 89'; Gómez (yellow card) 90+2'	Report	Costa (yellow card) 55'; Matić (yellow card) 86'	Stadium: Stadium of Light; Attendance: 45,232; Referee: Kevin Friend

3 December 2014 14	Sunderland	1–4	Manchester City	Sunderland
19:45	Wickham 19'; Cattermole (yellow card) 71'	Report	Agüero 21', 71'; Jovetić 39'; Zabaleta 55'; Boyata (yellow card) 65'	Stadium: Stadium of Light; Attendance: 41,152; Referee: Craig Pawson

6 December 2014 15	Liverpool	0–0	Sunderland	Liverpool
15:00	Lucas (yellow card) 51'	Report	Vergini (yellow card) 41'; Bridcutt (yellow card) 60'; Buckley (yellow card) 80'	Stadium: Anfield; Attendance: 44,716 (1,829 away fans); Referee: Neil Swarbrick

13 December 2014 16	Sunderland	1–1	West Ham United	Sunderland
15:00	Gómez 22' (pen.), (yellow card) 57'; Wickham (yellow card) 82'	Report	Downing 29', (yellow card) 80'; Reid (yellow card) 40'	Stadium: Stadium of Light; Attendance: 41,694; Referee: Phil Dowd

21 December 2014 17	Newcastle United	0–1	Sunderland	Newcastle
13:30	Coloccini (yellow card) 9'; Tioté (yellow card) 24'; Colback (yellow card) 25'; Dummett (yellow card) 90+2'	Report	Coates (yellow card) 2'; Wickham (yellow card) 39'; Cattermole (yellow card) 56'; O'Shea (yellow card) 69'; Johnson 90'	Stadium: St James' Park; Attendance: 52,315 (2,738 away fans); Referee: Anthony Taylor

26 December 2014 18	Sunderland	1–3	Hull City	Sunderland
15:00	Johnson 1'; Larsson (yellow card) 16'; Vergini (yellow card) 19'; Gómez (yellow card) 49'; Fletcher (yellow card) 53'; Jones (yellow card) 74'	Report	Ramírez 33'; Chester (yellow card) 45+1' (goal) 51'; Brady (yellow card) 73'; Jelavić 90+6'	Stadium: Stadium of Light; Attendance: 44,817; Referee: Andre Marriner

28 December 2014 19	Aston Villa	0–0	Sunderland	Birmingham
15:00	Vlaar (yellow card) 44'; Delph (red card) 49'	Report	Cattermole (yellow card) 56'; Johnson (yellow card) 74'; Brown (yellow card) 89'; Giaccherini (yellow card) 90+2'	Stadium: Villa Park; Attendance: 35,436 (2,955 away fans); Referee: Martin Atkinson

1 January 2015 20	Manchester City	3–2	Sunderland	Manchester
15:00	Nasri (yellow card) 51'; Touré 57'; Jovetić 66'; Zabaleta (yellow card) 71'; Lampard 73'	Report	Jones (yellow card) 17'; Larsson (yellow card) 34'; Rodwell 68'; Johnson 71' (pen.); Brown (yellow card) 88'	Stadium: City of Manchester Stadium; Attendance: 45,367 (1,403 away fans); Referee: Roger East

10 January 2015 21	Sunderland	0–1	Liverpool	Sunderland
12:45	Vergini (yellow card) 28'; Bridcutt (yellow card) 35' (yellow-red card) 49'	Report	Marković 9'; Borini (yellow card) 17'; Coutinho (yellow card) 36'; Henderson (yellow card) 54'; Lovren (yellow card) 55'	Stadium: Stadium of Light; Attendance: 45,369; Referee: Craig Pawson

17 January 2015 22	Tottenham Hotspur	2–1	Sunderland	Tottenham
15:00	Vertonghen 3', (yellow card) 30'; Eriksen 88'	Report	Larsson 31'; Rodwell (yellow card) 58'; Jones (yellow card) 87'	Stadium: White Hart Lane; Attendance: 35,973 (2,940 away fans); Referee: Chris Foy

31 January 2015 23	Sunderland	2–0	Burnley	Sunderland
15:00	Wickham 20'; Defoe 34'; Johnson (yellow card) 69'; Larsson (yellow card) 89'; Pantilimon (yellow card) 90+3'	Report	Marney (yellow card) 90+4'	Stadium: Stadium of Light; Attendance: 44,022; Referee: Lee Mason

7 February 2015 24	Swansea City	1–1	Sunderland	Swansea
15:00	Cork (yellow card) 16'; Dyer (yellow card) 31'; Ki 66'; Naughton (yellow card) 75'	Report	Defoe 42'; Bridcutt (yellow card) 49'; Larsson (yellow card) 71'; Gómez (yellow card) 77'; Fletcher (yellow card) 88'	Stadium: Liberty Stadium; Attendance: 20,355 (1,630 away fans); Referee: Phil Dowd

10 February 2015 25	Sunderland	0–2	Queens Park Rangers	Sunderland
19:45	Larsson (yellow card) 41'; Álvarez (yellow card) 83'	Report	Fer 17'; Zamora (yellow card) 35' (goal) 45+1'; Ferdinand (yellow card) 70'; Barton (yellow card) 78'	Stadium: Stadium of Light; Attendance: 39,077; Referee: Martin Atkinson

21 February 2015 26	Sunderland	0–0	West Bromwich Albion	Sunderland
15:00	Álvarez (yellow card) 11'	Report	Lescott (yellow card) 5'; Dawson (yellow card) 29'	Stadium: Stadium of Light; Attendance: 40,943; Referee: Mike Jones

28 February 2015 27	Manchester United	2–0	Sunderland	Manchester
15:00	Valencia (yellow card) 45+1'; Rooney 66' (pen.), 84'	Report	Brown (red card) 65'; Van Aanholt (yellow card) 79'	Stadium: Old Trafford; Attendance: 75,344 (2,461 away fans); Referee: Roger East

3 March 2015 28	Hull City	1–1	Sunderland	Kingston upon Hull
19:45	N'Doye 15'; McShane (yellow card) 42'; Robertson (yellow card) 79'	Report	Brown (yellow card) 12'; Rodwell (yellow card) 36', (goal) 77'; Bridcutt (yellow card) 46'; Cattermole (yellow card) 60'; Larsson (yellow card) 79'; Álvarez (yellow card) 87'	Stadium: KC Stadium; Attendance: 23,017 (2,474 away fans); Referee: Mike Dean

14 March 2015 29	Sunderland	0–4	Aston Villa	Sunderland
15:00 GMT	Bridcutt (yellow card) 90+1'	Report	Bacuna (yellow card) 8'; Benteke 16', 44'; Agbonlahor 18', 37'	Stadium: Stadium of Light; Attendance: 45,746; Referee: Neil Swarbrick

21 March 2015 30	West Ham United	1–0	Sunderland	London
17:30	Sakho 88'	Report	Wickham (yellow card) 63'	Stadium: Boleyn Ground; Attendance: 34,914 (1,800 away fans); Referee: Lee Mason

5 April 2015 31	Sunderland	1–0	Newcastle United	Sunderland
16:00	Vergini (yellow card) 39'; Defoe 45+1'; Gómez (yellow card) 61'; Van Aanholt (yellow card) 66'; Wickham (yellow card) 77'; Larsson (yellow card) 81'	Report	Taylor (yellow card) 41'; Colback (yellow card) 62'	Stadium: Stadium of Light; Attendance: 47,563; Referee: Mike Dean

11 April 2015 32	Sunderland	1–4	Crystal Palace	Sunderland
15:00	Rodwell (yellow card) 16'; Cattermole (yellow card) 24'; Wickham 90'	Report	Dann (yellow card) 18'; Murray 48'; Bolasie 51', 53', 62'; McArthur (yellow card) 67'	Stadium: Stadium of Light; Attendance: 42,073; Referee: Anthony Taylor

25 April 2015 33	Stoke City	1–1	Sunderland	Stoke-on-Trent
15:00	Adam 27'; Diouf (yellow card) 58'; Wollscheid (yellow card) 60'	Report	Wickham 1'; Cattermole (yellow card) 18'; O'Shea (yellow card) 62'; Jones (yellow card) 80'	Stadium: Britannia Stadium; Attendance: 26,706; Referee: Martin Atkinson

2 May 2015 34	Sunderland	2–1	Southampton	Sunderland
15:00	Gómez 21' (pen.), 55' (pen.); Jones (yellow card) 32'; Cattermole (yellow card) 60'	Report	Mané 22'; Ward-Prowse (red card) 54'; Wanyama (yellow card) 63'; Pellè (yellow card) 90+5'	Stadium: Stadium of Light; Attendance: 39,613; Referee: Mike Jones

9 May 2015 35	Everton	0–2	Sunderland	Liverpool
12:45 BST	Coleman (yellow card) 73'; Garbutt (yellow card) 88'	Report	Brown (yellow card) 42'; Graham 53'; Gómez (yellow card) 65'; Defoe (yellow card) 66', (goal) 85'	Stadium: Goodison Park; Attendance: 38,246; Referee: Lee Probert

16 May 2015 36	Sunderland	0–0	Leicester City	Sunderland
15:00 BST	Bridcutt (yellow card) 29'; Cattermole (yellow card) 43'; Wickham (yellow card) 66'; Larsson (yellow card) 79'	Report	Huth (yellow card) 63'	Stadium: Stadium of Light; Attendance: 46,705; Referee: Martin Atkinson

20 May 2015 37	Arsenal	0–0	Sunderland	London
19:45 BST	Ramsey (yellow card) 18'	Report		Stadium: Emirates Stadium; Attendance: 59,987; Referee: Anthony Taylor

24 May 2015 38	Chelsea	3–1	Sunderland	London
15:00 BST	Costa 37' (pen.); Cuadrado (yellow card) 42'; Rémy 70', 88'; Matić (yellow card) 82'	Report	Fletcher 26'; Rodwell (yellow card) 32'	Stadium: Stamford Bridge; Attendance: 41,620; Referee: Lee Mason

=== FA Cup ===
4 January 2015 Third round	Sunderland	1–0	Leeds United	Sunderland
13:00	Van Aanholt 33'; Bridcutt (yellow card) 71'	Report	Murphy (yellow card) 36'	Stadium: Stadium of Light; Attendance: 30,302; Referee: Mike Dean

24 January 2015 Fourth round	Sunderland	0–0	Fulham	Sunderland
15:00	Rodwell (yellow card) 30' (yellow-red card) 66'; Coates (yellow card) 55'; Buckley (yellow card) 86'	Report		Stadium: Stadium of Light; Attendance: 22,961; Referee: Anthony Taylor

3 February 2015 Replay	Fulham	1–3	Sunderland	London
19:45	Rodallega 28'; Woodrow (yellow card) 40'; Bodurov (yellow card) 62'; Fofana (yellow card) 82'; McCormack (yellow card) 89'; Hutchinson (yellow card) 90+5'	Report	Bridcutt (yellow card) 25'; Bettinelli 61' (o.g.); Álvarez 75', (yellow card) 82'; Giaccherini (yellow card) 82'; Gómez 90+3' (pen.)	Stadium: Craven Cottage; Attendance: 14,777 (4,200 away fans); Referee: Paul Tierney

15 February 2015 Fifth round	Bradford City	2–0	Sunderland	Bradford
14:30	O'Shea 3' (o.g.); Clarke (yellow card) 31'; Stead 61'	Report	Fletcher (yellow card) 10'; Larsson (yellow card) 36'; Jones (yellow card) 67'	Stadium: Valley Parade; Attendance: 24,021 (4,253 away fans); Referee: Kevin Friend

=== Football League Cup ===
27 August 2014 Second round	Birmingham City	0–3	Sunderland	Birmingham
19:45	Thomas (yellow card) 53'	Report	Gómez 77'; Johnson 87'; Wickham 88'	Stadium: St Andrew's; Attendance: 11,245 (1,997 away fans); Referee: Darren Bond

23 September 2014 Third round	Sunderland	1–2	Stoke City	Sunderland
	Altidore 16', (yellow card) 90+1'; Rodwell (yellow card) 36'; O'Shea (yellow card) 90'; Bridcutt (yellow card) 90+5'	Report	Muniesa 31', 71'; Nzonzi (yellow card) 36'; Arnautović (yellow card) 63'; Huth (yellow card) 90+2'	Stadium: Stadium of Light; Attendance: 17,353; Referee: Mike Dean

=== First team squad ===
Squad No.	Name	Nationality	Position (s)	Date of Birth (Age)	Signed from
Goalkeepers
1	Costel Pantilimon	(Romania)	GK	1 February 1987 (age 39)	(England) Manchester City
25	Vito Mannone	(Italy)	GK	2 March 1988 (age 38)	(England) Arsenal
Defenders
2	Billy Jones	(England)	RB	24 March 1987 (age 39)	(England) West Bromwich Albion
3	Patrick van Aanholt	(Netherlands)	LB	29 August 1990 (age 35)	(England) Chelsea
5	Wes Brown	(England)	CB	13 October 1979 (age 46)	(England) Manchester United
15	Anthony Réveillère	(France)	RB	10 November 1979 (age 46)	(Italy) Napoli
16	John O'Shea	(Republic of Ireland)	CB	30 April 1981 (age 45)	(England) Manchester United
22	Sebastián Coates	(Uruguay)	CB	7 October 1990 (age 35)	(England) Liverpool (On loan)
27	Santiago Vergini	(Argentina)	CB	3 August 1988 (age 37)	(Argentina) Estudiantes (On loan)
Midfielders
4	Liam Bridcutt	(Scotland)	DM	8 May 1989 (age 37)	(England) Brighton & Hove Albion
6	Lee Cattermole	(England)	DM	21 March 1988 (age 38)	(England) Wigan Athletic
7	Sebastian Larsson	(Sweden)	CM	6 June 1985 (age 40)	(England) Birmingham City
8	Jack Rodwell	(England)	CM	11 March 1991 (age 35)	(England) Manchester City
11	Adam Johnson	(England)	RW	14 July 1987 (age 38)	(England) Manchester City
14	Jordi Gómez	(Spain)	CM	24 May 1985 (age 41)	(England) Wigan Athletic
20	Ricky Álvarez	(Argentina)	AM	12 April 1988 (age 38)	(Italy) Inter Milan (On loan)
23	Emanuele Giaccherini	(Italy)	AM	5 May 1985 (age 41)	(Italy) Juventus
30	Will Buckley	(England)	LW	21 November 1989 (age 36)	(England) Brighton & Hove Albion
Forwards
9	Steven Fletcher	(Scotland)	CF	26 March 1987 (age 39)	(England) Wolverhampton Wanderers
10	Connor Wickham	(England)	CF	31 March 1993 (age 33)	(England) Ipswich Town
19	Danny Graham	(England)	CF	12 August 1985 (age 40)	(Wales) Swansea City
28	Jermain Defoe	(England)	CF	7 October 1982 (age 43)	(Canada) Toronto FC
