= Liam Bridcutt =

Scottish footballer (born 1989)

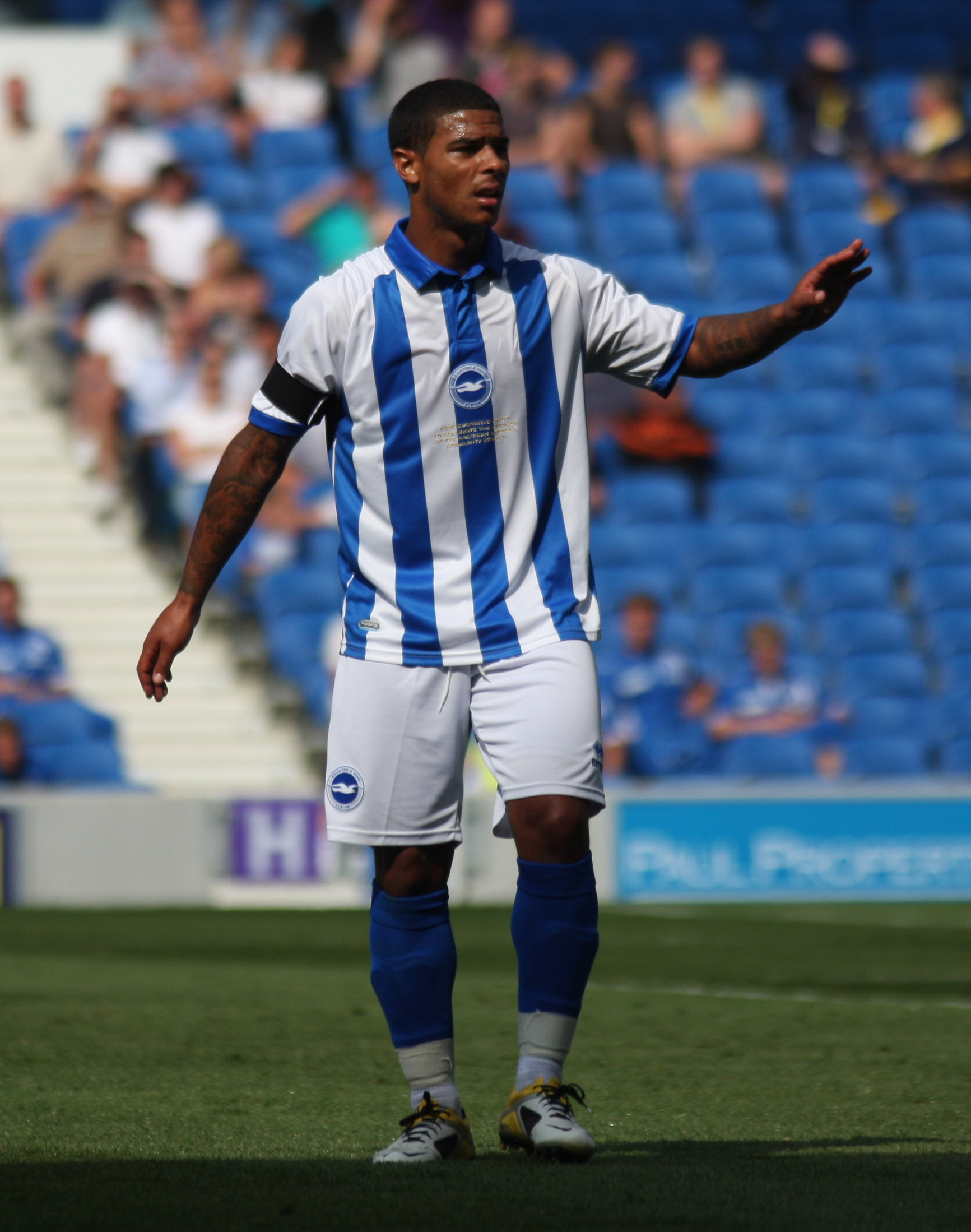
- Bridcutt playing for Brighton & Hove Albion in 2011

Personal information
- Full name: Liam Robert Bridcutt
- Date of birth: 8 May 1989 (age 37)
- Place of birth: Reading, England
- Height: 5 ft 9 in (1.75 m)
- Position: Defensive midfielder

Team information
- Current team: Ashington AFC (Manager)

Youth career
- –2007: Chelsea

Senior career*
Years	Team	Apps	(Gls)
2007–2010	Chelsea	0	(0)
2008	→ Yeovil Town (loan)	9	(0)
2008–2009	→ Watford (loan)	6	(0)
2009–2010	→ Stockport County (loan)	15	(0)
2010–2014	Brighton & Hove Albion	132	(2)
2014–2016	Sunderland	30	(0)
2015–2016	→ Leeds United (loan)	24	(0)
2016–2017	Leeds United	25	(0)
2017–2020	Nottingham Forest	28	(1)
2019–2020	→ Bolton Wanderers (loan)	11	(0)
2020	→ Lincoln City (loan)	5	(1)
2020–2022	Lincoln City	37	(0)
2022–2023	Blackpool	4	(0)
Total		326	(4)

International career
2013–2016	Scotland	2	(0)
- * Club domestic league appearances and goals

Liam Robert Bridcutt (born 8 May 1989) is a former professional footballer who played as a defensive midfielder. He is a coach at National League side Gateshead. Born in England, he represented the Scotland national team.

Bridcutt started his career with Chelsea, but did not make a league appearance for the London club. He was loaned to Yeovil Town, Watford and Stockport County, before moving to Brighton & Hove Albion in 2010. He was a member of the Brighton side that won the League One title in the 2010–11 season. Bridcutt won back-to-back Player of the Year awards at Brighton, earning him a move to Premier League side Sunderland in 2014. He spent three seasons with the Wearside club before moving to Leeds United following a successful loan spell. Bridcutt had spells with Nottingham Forest, Bolton Wanderers, Lincoln City and Blackpool before ending his playing career in 2024.

== Club career ==
=== Chelsea ===
Born in Reading, Berkshire, Bridcutt rose through the youth system at Chelsea, and signed a professional contract in the summer of 2007. He signed on loan for Yeovil Town on 8 February 2008 and made his début against Walsall the following day. He then moved to Watford on loan on 27 November 2008, making his début for the club against Doncaster Rovers on 29 November 2008.

On 14 August 2009, Bridcutt moved to Stockport County on loan until January 2010 and was sent off on his début in the 4–2 win at Brighton & Hove Albion. He scored his first professional goal whilst at Stockport during a Football League Trophy game against Port Vale.

=== Brighton & Hove Albion ===
On 28 August 2010, Bridcutt signed a five-month contract with League One side Brighton & Hove Albion. On 5 November 2010, he signed a contract extension until the end of the season after impressing Gus Poyet especially against Plymouth Argyle and Peterborough United. Bridcutt scored his first goal in Albion colours in stoppage time of their 4–3 win over Carlisle United. He followed this up with one of the goals in the 4–3 victory against Dagenham & Redbridge which led to Brighton's promotion to the Championship.

Bridcutt's consistent performances in the 2011–12 Championship campaign earned him Brighton's Player of the Season award. Bridcutt's performances in the following 2012–13 Championship campaign earned him his second successive Player of the Season award.

=== Sunderland ===
On 30 January 2014, after weeks of speculation and a transfer request which was subsequently rejected by Brighton, Bridcutt signed a three-and-a-half-year deal with Sunderland, reuniting him with former Brighton head coach Gus Poyet.

Bridcutt signed for an undisclosed fee, believed to be between £3 million and £4 million, and made his Sunderland début in the Tyne–Wear derby in a 3–0 victory over Newcastle United at St James' Park on 1 February.

==== Leeds United (loan) ====
Bridcutt moved on loan to Leeds United on 26 November 2015. He made his Leeds debut on 28 November in a 1–0 defeat against Queens Park Rangers. After impressing in the heart of the Leeds midfield, on 5 January 2016, Bridcutt's loan was extended until the end of the 2015–16 season, with the view to a permanent move.

On 13 March 2016, Leeds head coach Steve Evans revealed he wanted to sign Bridcutt permanently at the end of the season.

Despite being at the club for less than a season, on 19 April, Bridcutt was one of five players nominated for the Leeds United Player of the Year Award, alongside Charlie Taylor, Gaetano Berardi, Mirco Antenucci and Lewis Cook. The award was won by Taylor on 30 April.

=== Leeds United ===
On 16 August 2016, Bridcutt transferred to Leeds United for an undisclosed fee, signing a two-year contract. His second debut for Leeds came on 20 August in a 2–0 win against Sheffield Wednesday. Bridcutt was appointed team captain, replacing the departed Sol Bamba on 9 September 2016.

Bridcutt picked up an injury on 14 September against Blackburn Rovers and it was revealed that Bridcutt had broken his foot and would miss several months of the season as a result of the injury. Bridcutt returned from injury on 13 December replacing an injured Chris Wood as a first-half substitute in a 2–0 win against Reading.

At the start of the 2017–18 season, Leeds manager Thomas Christiansen named Liam Cooper captain, replacing Bridcutt.

=== Nottingham Forest ===
On 22 August 2017, Bridcutt joined Championship side Nottingham Forest on a three-year deal for undisclosed fee, thought to be in the region of £1,000,000. He scored his first goal for the club in a 2–1 loss at Cardiff City on 21 April 2018.

==== Bolton Wanderers (loan) ====
On 2 September 2019, Bridcutt joined EFL League One side Bolton Wanderers on loan until January and was one of nine players Bolton signed on deadline day. He made his debut on 14 September, starting against Rotherham United in a 6–1 defeat. On 17 September, Bridcutt started captaining Bolton. Bridcutt's loan was ended a few days early by Forest on 1 January 2020.

==== Lincoln City (loan) ====
On 31 January 2020, Bridcutt joined Lincoln City on loan for the remainder of the 2020 season. Bridcutt was named captain for the match against Gillingham on 22 February 2020 due to Jason Shackell being dropped from the squad. He continued in his role as Captain as Shackell remained out of the team.

=== Lincoln City ===
On 7 August 2020, Bridcutt joined Lincoln City permanently following his expiration of his contract at Nottingham Forest. He would make his first appearance as a permanent member of the team, coming off the bench in a 5–0 win against Bradford City in the EFL Cup second round. It was revealed on 18 May 2022 that he had been offered a new contract at Lincoln City. On 27 June 2022, Lincoln confirmed that Bridcutt would be leaving the club after two and a half seasons.

=== Blackpool ===
On 30 September 2022, Bridcutt signed for Blackpool on a one-year contract with an option for a further year, rejoining his former manager at Lincoln, Michael Appleton. On 16 May 2023, the club announced that Bridcutt was being released.

== International career ==
Born in England, Bridcutt is of Scottish, Trinidadian and Grenadian descent. He qualified to play for Scotland through his Edinburgh-born grandfather. On 7 March 2013, Bridcutt was named in Gordon Strachan's Scotland squad for the 2014 FIFA World Cup qualification matches against Wales and Serbia. He gained his first Scotland cap in the game versus Serbia on 26 March 2013.

After regaining his form whilst at Leeds United, Bridcutt regained his place in the Scotland squad on 10 March 2016 for a friendly against Denmark. He was called up alongside teammate Liam Cooper who made the squad for the first time. On 29 March 2016, Bridcutt played against Denmark in a 1–0 victory, and was subject to heavy criticism from Denmark Manager Age Hareide for a challenge on Denmark defender Erik Sviatchenko which only earned Bricutt a yellow card.

== Coaching career ==
After retiring from football in February 2024, Bridcutt began working as a sessional coach at Newcastle United's academy. On 15 October 2024, it was announced that he had appointed as a coach for National League side Gateshead as part of newly appointed manager Carl Magnay's coaching staff.

== Career statistics ==
Appearances and goals by club, season and competition
Club	Season	League			FA Cup		League Cup		Other		Total	
Club	Season	Division	Apps	Goals	Apps	Goals	Apps	Goals	Apps	Goals	Apps	Goals
Chelsea	2007–08	Premier League	0	0	0	0	0	0	0	0	0	0
Yeovil Town (loan)	2007–08	League One	9	0	0	0	0	0	0	0	9	0
Watford (loan)	2008–09	Championship	6	0	2	0	1	0	0	0	9	0
Stockport County (loan)	2009–10	League One	15	0	2	0	0	0	2 (Note: Appearance(s) in the EFL Trophy.)	1	19	1
Brighton & Hove Albion	2010–11	League One	37	2	6	0	0	0	1	0	44	2
Brighton & Hove Albion	2011–12	Championship	43	0	3	0	3	0	—		49	0
Brighton & Hove Albion	2012–13	Championship	41	0	2	0	1	0	2 (Note: Appearance(s) in the Championship play-offs.)	0	46	0
Brighton & Hove Albion	2013–14	Championship	11	0	0	0	1	0	—		12	0
Brighton & Hove Albion	Total		132	2	11	0	5	0	3	0	151	2
Sunderland	2013–14	Premier League	12	0	0	0	0	0	—		12	0
Sunderland	2014–15	Premier League	18	0	4	0	2	0	—		24	0
Sunderland	2015–16	Premier League	0	0	0	0	0	0	—		0	0
Sunderland	Total		30	0	4	0	2	0	—		36	0
Leeds United (loan)	2015–16	Championship	24	0	3	0	0	0	—		27	0
Leeds United	2016–17	Championship	25	0	0	0	0	0	—		25	0
Leeds United	2017–18	Championship	0	0	0	0	1	0	—		1	0
Leeds United	Total		49	0	3	0	1	0	0	0	53	0
Nottingham Forest	2017–18	Championship	25	1	0	0	0	0	—		25	1
Nottingham Forest	2018–19	Championship	1	0	0	0	3	0	—		4	0
Bolton Wanderers (loan)	2019–20	League One	11	0	0	0	0	0	1	0	12	0
Lincoln City (loan)	2019–20	League One	5	1	0	0	0	0	—		5	1
Lincoln City	2020–21	League One	23	0	0	0	2	0	5 (Note: Appearance(s) in League One Play-offs & Football League Trophy)	0	30	0
Lincoln City	2021–22	League One	14	0	0	0	0	0	1	0	15	0
Lincoln City	Total		42	1	0	0	2	0	6	0	51	1
Blackpool	2022–23	Championship	4	0	0	0	0	0	0	0	4	0
Career total			324	4	22	0	14	0	12	1	372	5

== Honours ==
Brighton & Hove Albion

- Football League One: 2010–11

Individual

- Brighton & Hove Albion Player of the Year: 2011–12, 2012–13

== See also ==
- List of Scotland international footballers born outside Scotland
