= Santiago Vergini =

Argentine footballer

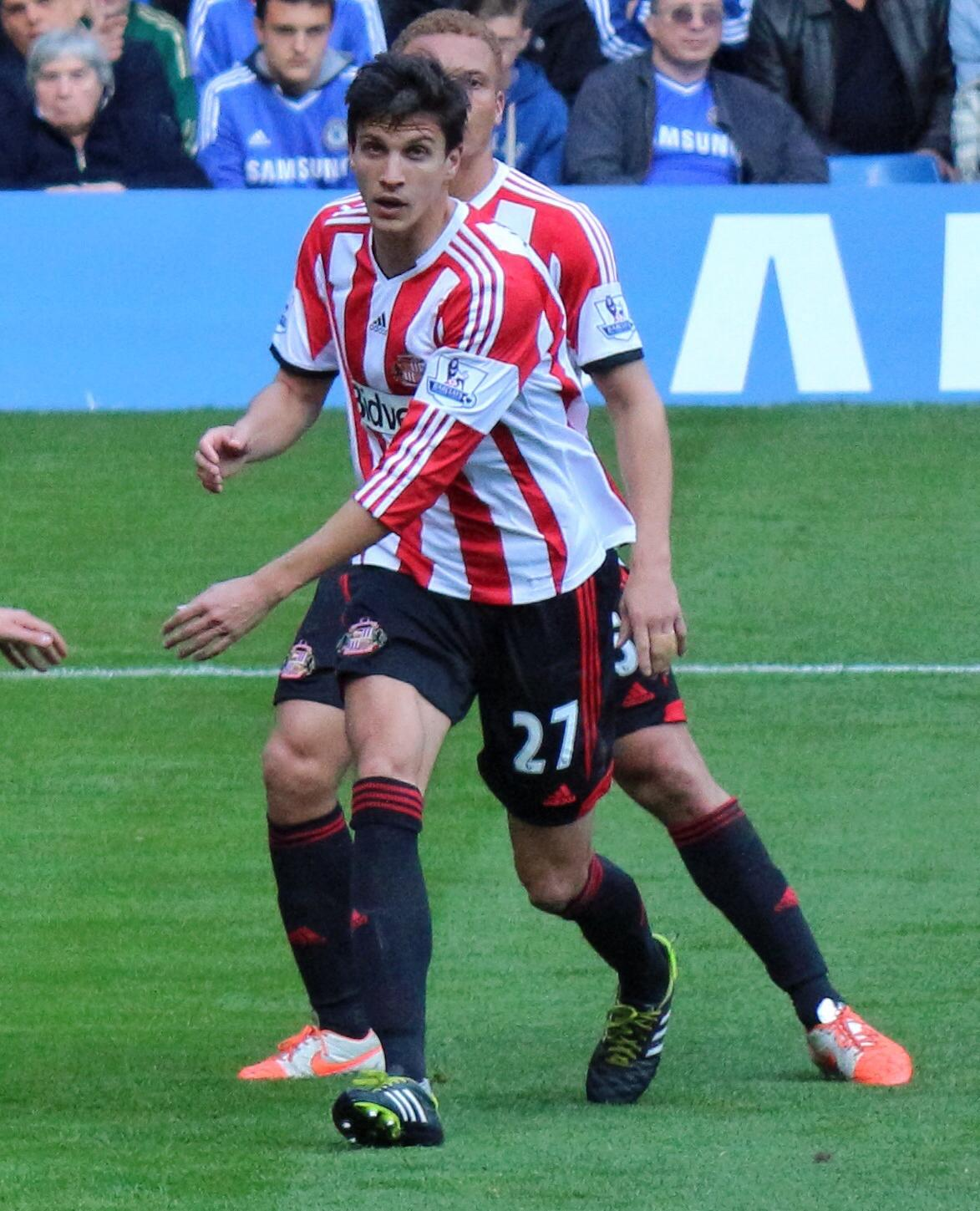
- Vergini with Sunderland in 2014

Personal information
- Full name: Santiago Vergini
- Date of birth: 3 August 1988 (age 38)
- Place of birth: Máximo Paz, Argentina
- Height: 1.91 m (6 ft 3 in)
- Position: Centre-back

Youth career
- Atlético Paz
- 2007–2009: Vélez Sarsfield

Senior career*
Years	Team	Apps	(Gls)
2009–2011	Olimpia	16	(1)
2010–2011	→ Verona (loan)	15	(1)
2011–2013	Newell's Old Boys	66	(4)
2013–2015	Estudiantes	17	(1)
2014–2015	→ Sunderland (loan)	42	(0)
2015–2016	Sunderland	0	(0)
2015–2016	→ Getafe (loan)	25	(0)
2016–2018	Boca Juniors	36	(0)
2018–2019	Bursaspor	8	(0)
2019–2021	San Lorenzo	6	(0)
2021	→ Atlético Tucumán (loan)	20	(1)

International career
2012–2014	Argentina	3	(0)
- * Club domestic league appearances and goals as of 18:25, 14 March 2022 (UTC)

Santiago Vergini (born 3 August 1988) is an Argentine professional footballer who plays as a centre-back.

== Club career ==
=== Early career ===
Born in Máximo Paz, Constitución Department, Santa Fe, Vergini was a Vélez Sársfield youth graduate, but only appeared with the reserves in the lower leagues. In June 2009, he signed a two-year deal with Paraguayan side Club Olimpia, and made his professional debut on 13 September, in a 0–2 home loss against Club Libertad.

Vergini scored his first goal on 7 November, netting the second in a 2–1 home win against Sportivo Luqueño. He finished his first professional year with 12 appearances and one goal, as his side finished fifth.

On 1 September 2010, Vergini was loaned to Lega Pro Prima Divisione team Verona, in a one-year deal. He appeared in 15 matches, scoring a goal against Bassano Virtus.

=== Newell's Old Boys ===
On 26 July 2011 Vergini signed for Newell's Old Boys. He made his debut for the club on 2 September, playing the full 90 minutes in a 0–0 home draw against Colón de Santa Fe.

An undisputed starter for La Lepra, Vergini appeared in 32 matches and scored three goals in 2011–12 (against Olimpo, Banfield and Unión Santa Fe). He was again ever-present in the following campaign, as his side reached the semi-finals of 2013 Copa Libertadores.

=== Estudiantes ===
On 1 August 2013, after being linked to a possible move to Barcelona, Vergini joined Estudiantes. He appeared in 17 matches, scoring one goal (against Godoy Cruz on 16 November).

=== Sunderland ===
On 20 January 2014, Vergini secured a loan move to Premier League side Sunderland for the remainder of the 2013–14 season. He made his league debut on 8 February, replacing Fabio Borini in the first half against Hull City after the dismissal of regular centre-back Wes Brown.

Vergini made his first start on 22 February away to Arsenal. He was also an unused substitute as Sunderland lost the 2014 Football League Cup Final 3–1 to Manchester City at Wembley on 2 March.

After several games playing in central defence, manager Gus Poyet slotted Vergini into the right back position due to injuries. He helped Sunderland avoid relegation to finish 14th in the Premier League.

On 7 August 2014, he re-signed for Sunderland on a season-long loan for the 2014–15 campaign, with the deal becoming a permanent two-year contract after the Black Cats avoided relegation.

In October 2014, Vergini scored an own goal during a Premier League game against Southampton, volleying from the edge of the penalty area past goalkeeper Vito Mannone. Luke Perry of the BBC described it as "one of the Premier League's most spectacular own goals". It was the first goal in an 8–0 away defeat for the Black Cats.

==== Getafe (loan) ====
On 16 July 2015 Vergini was loaned to Spanish La Liga side Getafe in a season-long deal, with a view to a permanent transfer.

=== Boca Juniors ===
In June 2016, Vergini returned to his home country and signed with Boca Juniors, for an undisclosed fee.

=== Bursaspor ===
On 28 August 2018 he has signed a two-year deal with Bursaspor.

=== San Lorenzo ===
Ahead of the 2019–20 season, Vergini returned to Argentina and signed a three-year contract with San Lorenzo.

== International career ==
Vergini earned his first cap for Argentina in a 1–2 Superclásico de las Américas loss at Brazil on 20 September 2012, after coming on as a 73rd-minute substitute for Lisandro López. He returned to the team on 14 October 2014, playing the entirety of a 7–0 friendly away win against Hong Kong and again in November 2014, starting in a 2–1 success over Croatia at the Boleyn Ground.

== Career statistics ==
=== Club ===
As of 15 February 2019

Club	League	Season	League		Cup		Continental		Other		Total	
Club	League	Season	Apps	Goals	Apps	Goals	Apps	Goals	Apps	Goals	Apps	Goals
Olimpia	Primera División	2009	12	1	0	0	0	0	0	0	12	1
Olimpia	Primera División	2010	4	0	0	0	0	0	0	0	4	0
Olimpia	Total		16	1	0	0	0	0	0	0	16	1
Verona	Lega Pro	2010–11	15	1	0	0	0	0	0	0	15	1
Newell's Old Boys	Primera División	2011–12	32	3	0	0	0	0	0	0	32	3
Newell's Old Boys	Primera División	2012–13	34	1	1	0	12	0	0	0	47	1
Newell's Old Boys	Total		66	4	1	0	12	0	0	0	79	4
Estudiantes	Primera División	2013–14	17	1	1	0	0	0	0	0	18	1
Sunderland	Premier League	2013–14	11	0	3	0	0	0	0	0	14	0
Sunderland	Premier League	2014–15	31	0	4	0	0	0	2	0	37	0
Sunderland	Total		42	0	7	0	0	0	2	0	51	0
Getafe	La Liga	2015–16	25	0	2	1	0	0	0	0	27	1
Boca Juniors	Primera División	2016–17	28	0	0	0	0	0	0	0	28	0
Boca Juniors	Primera División	2017–18	8	0	0	0	5	0	0	0	13	0
Boca Juniors	Total		36	0	0	0	5	0	0	0	41	1
Bursaspor	Süper Lig	2018–19	6	0	1	0	0	0	0	0	7	0
Career total			223	7	12	1	17	0	2	0	254	8

=== International ===
As of 12 November 2014

Argentina
Year	Apps	Goals
2012	1	0
2014	2	0
Total	3	0

== Honours ==
Newell's Old Boys

- Primera División runner-up: Torneo Final 2013, Torneo Inicial 2013

Sunderland

- Football League Cup runner-up: 2013–14
