= Connor Wickham =

English footballer (born 1993)

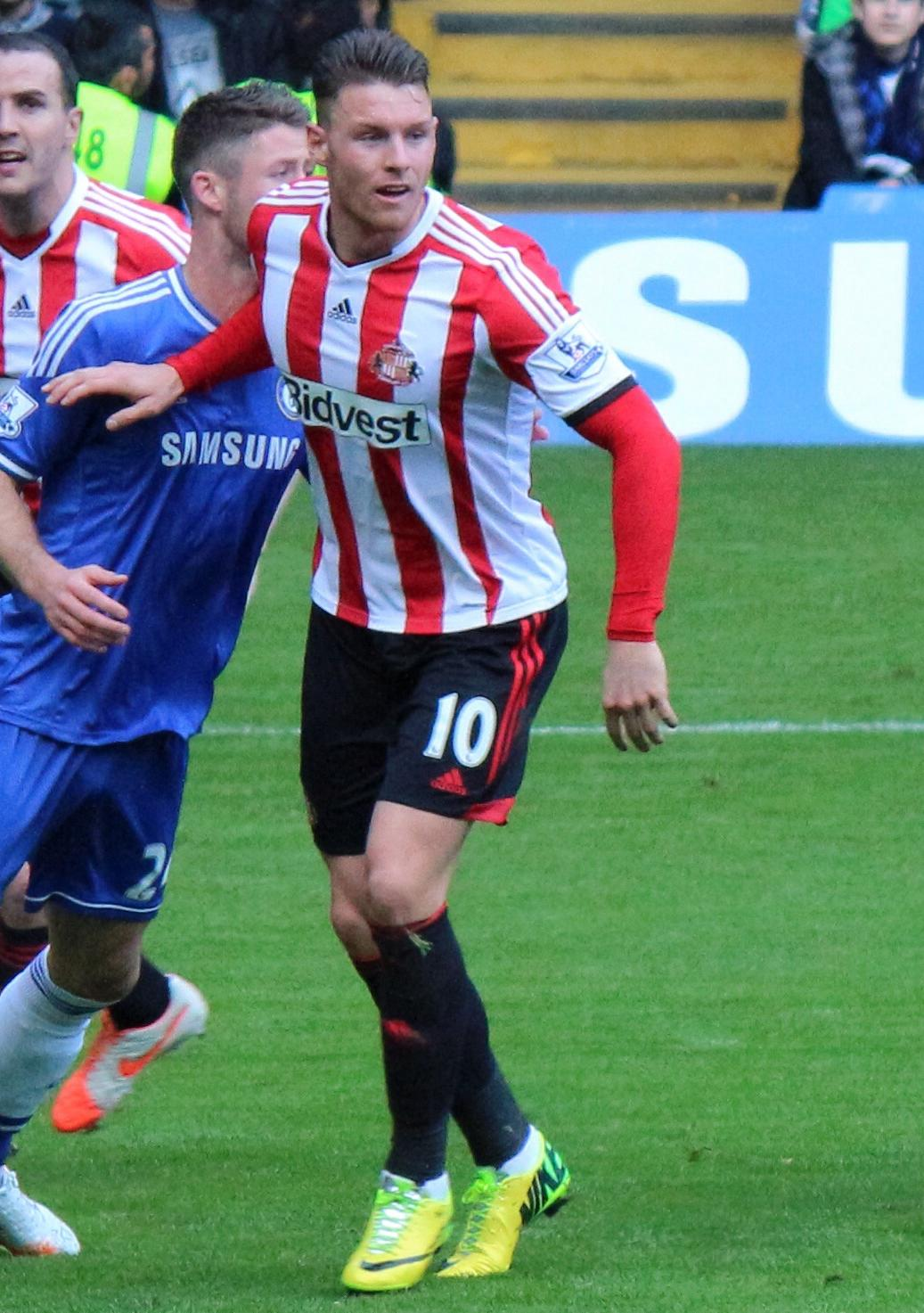
- Wickham playing for Sunderland in 2014

Personal information
- Full name: Connor Neil Ralph Wickham
- Date of birth: 31 March 1993 (age 33)
- Place of birth: Hereford, England
- Height: 6 ft 3 in (1.91 m)
- Positions: Forward; winger

Team information
- Current team: Crawley Town

Youth career
- 2002–2006: Reading
- 2006–2009: Ipswich Town

Senior career*
Years	Team	Apps	(Gls)
2009–2011	Ipswich Town	65	(13)
2011–2015	Sunderland	79	(11)
2013	→ Sheffield Wednesday (loan)	6	(1)
2013–2014	→ Sheffield Wednesday (loan)	11	(8)
2014	→ Leeds United (loan)	5	(0)
2015–2021	Crystal Palace	41	(8)
2020	→ Sheffield Wednesday (loan)	13	(2)
2021–2022	Preston North End	1	(0)
2022	Milton Keynes Dons	13	(1)
2022–2023	Forest Green Rovers	16	(6)
2023–2024	Cardiff City	12	(1)
2024	Charlton Athletic	4	(1)
2025–2026	Dubai City	6	(2)
2026–	Crawley Town	1	(1)

International career^{‡}
2008	England U16	2	(1)
2009–2010	England U17	13	(9)
2010–2013	England U19	4	(1)
2010–2015	England U21	17	(6)
Medal record
Men's football
Representing England
UEFA European Under-17 Championship
Winner	2010 Liechtenstein
- * Club domestic league appearances and goals as of 11:26, 4 October 2025 (UTC) ‡ National team caps and goals as of 17:56, 9 April 2022 (UTC)

Connor Neil Ralph Wickham (born 31 March 1993) is an English professional footballer who plays as a forward for Crawley Town.

He has previously represented Ipswich Town, Sunderland, Sheffield Wednesday, Leeds United, Crystal Palace, Preston North End, Milton Keynes Dons and Forest Green Rovers.

Wickham has also played at various levels of international football for the England national team, and scored the winning goal in the 2010 UEFA European U17 Championship Final. He would be a great player but injury has ruined his career

== Early life ==
Wickham was born in Hereford, the son of an Army Warrant Officer. He attended Philip Morant School in Colchester, where he achieved eight A-C grade GCSEs – as well as being a prominent member of the school football team, where he was a prolific goalscorer from a young age. He played youth football with Reading for four years. Wickham's father is Northern Irish.

== Club career ==
=== Ipswich Town ===
==== 2008–09 ====
Wickham made his debut for the Ipswich Town first team on 11 April 2009, aged 16 years and 11 days. He came on as a 66th-minute substitute for Veliče Šumulikoski in a 3–1 home defeat against Doncaster Rovers and in doing so he became Ipswich's youngest ever player, beating the previous record being held by Jason Dozzell by 46 days.

==== 2009–10 ====
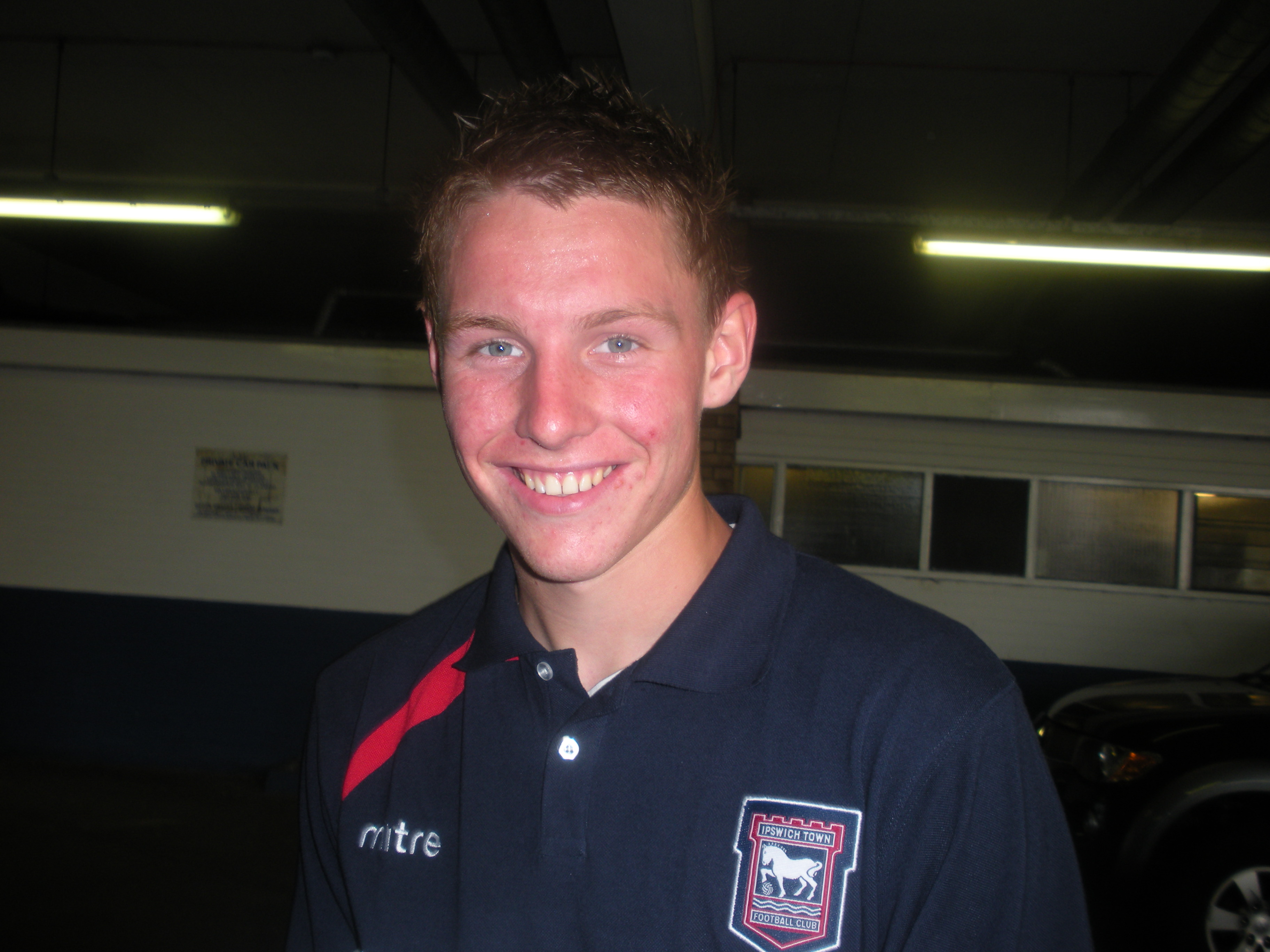
Wickham with Ipswich Town in 2009

Wickham scored his first two senior goals in only his fourth appearance, when he scored in Ipswich's 2009–10 League Cup tie against Shrewsbury Town. He also scored in the penalty shootout, which saw Ipswich prevail 4–2. He scored his first league goal in a 1–0 home victory over Scunthorpe United in March 2010, his winning effort coming deep into injury time. In April 2010, Wickham scored his second league goal, which came in the 90th minute in a 3–1 victory over Derby County. This came two days after he signed his first professional contract at Ipswich, a two-year deal following his 17th birthday.

In April 2010, Wickham was named the Football League young player of the month. He won the award after scoring three goals in four matches during that time.

==== 2010–11 ====
Wickham extended his contract with Ipswich to 2013 in January 2011. It had an offer clause in it which stated that if any bid equalled or bettered the one written in the contract, Ipswich would have to allow him to speak to the bidding club. It was reported that the figure was around the £15 million mark.

On 22 January 2011, Wickham scored Ipswich's his first goal of the season in a 3–2 win over Doncaster Rovers. Two games later, Wickham scored in a 3–0 win over Sheffield United at Portman Road. A clearance of a set piece saw Wickham collect the ball in his own half, and pass two opponents before wrong-footing Rob Kozluk and goalkeeper Steve Simonsen to tap the ball into the net. Former Ipswich player, Kevin Beattie witnessed the goal, and described it as one of the greatest goals ever scored at Portman Road. Two weeks later Wickham recorded his first professional hat-trick in a 6–0 win at Doncaster Rovers. Wickham's superb scoring form continued when he scored late in the match against Reading on 8 March. With Ipswich already 3–0 down, his goal counted for little, although it was once again a superb finish, as he volleyed a ball that was coming over his shoulder into the top corner of the goal from a tight angle.

On 4 March 2011, Wickham was named Championship player of the month for February after scoring four goals in the month, including his first professional hat-trick at Doncaster. Two weeks later he was named the Football League Young Player of the Year as well as the Championship Apprentice of the Year at the 2011 Football League Awards.

On 2 April 2011, Tottenham Hotspur manager, Harry Redknapp admitted that his side had not made a bid for Wickham. This was despite several reports to the contrary suggesting a bid in the region of £10m had been made. The same day, Wickham scored the second of Ipswich's two goals against Burnley in the Championship, as they won 2–1.

He signed a one-year extension to his contract on 8 April 2011, contracting him to the club until the summer of 2014. Wickham admitted he was delighted to have signed the contract, and said he just wanted to concentrate on achieving his goals with Ipswich, rather than focusing on speculation about his future. He said:

I'm obviously delighted to have signed a new contract and feel that I'm at the right club to progress as a player. After having a look over the last two years I approached this season wanting to make a real impact. It didn't start well with me getting injured but I feel I have moved forward as a player since I got back in the side. I'm playing games every week, I'm enjoying my football and the club is moving in the right direction and that's all I want.

— Connor Wickham,

=== Sunderland ===
On 29 June 2011, Wickham signed a four-year deal with Premier League club Sunderland for a fee of £8 million. The fee had the potential to rise to £12 million over the course of the contract. Despite having recently signed a new contract with Ipswich, Wickham had been widely tipped to move to a Premier League club following a highly successful 2010–11 season. Although Ipswich manager Paul Jewell had said there was no pressure to sell the youngster, Sunderland's eventual offer proved too lucrative. The fee broke Ipswich's record for transfer fees recouped, and broke the transfer record for a Football League player moving to a Premier League club. Ipswich's chief executive Simon Clegg summed it up:

As much as we would have liked to have kept Connor at Portman Road we have to be realistic and recognise that the offer from Sunderland was simply too good to turn down.

— Simon Clegg,

He scored his first goal for Sunderland in a pre-season friendly against Kilmarnock. Wickham made his first competitive appearance for Sunderland when he came on as a substitute in the 1–0 defeat to Newcastle United in the Tyne–Wear derby on 20 August 2011. He made his first Premier League start for Sunderland on 22 October 2011 where he helped Sunderland secure their second win of the season against Bolton Wanderers.

Wickham scored his first Premier League goal for the Black Cats a week later in the 2–2 draw with Aston Villa. The following week against Manchester United at Old Trafford, Wickham suffered a knee injury and had to be substituted just five minutes into the game. The arrival of new manager Martin O'Neill saw Wickham fall out of favour as he spent the majority of the remainder of the season on the bench and playing for the reserves. Wickham came off the bench at Bolton Wanderers in the third round of the FA Cup to score his first goal of the season as Sunderland came from 2–0 down to earn a replay.

==== Loan spells ====
On 8 February 2013, Wickham joined Sheffield Wednesday on loan, initially on a one-month deal. He made his debut on 9 February, in a 2–2 draw against Derby County. He scored his first goal for the club on 9 March, in a 1–0 win away against Leicester City in what was the last game of his loan spell, firing a first time volley into the roof of the net. On 14 March 2013 it was confirmed that Wickham would not be re-joining Sheffield Wednesday on loan.

On 27 August 2013, Wickham inspired Sunderland to a late comeback against Milton Keynes Dons in the Football League Cup, scoring twice and assisting Jozy Altidore's goal as the Premier League side scored four times in the last 20 minutes to win 4–2.

On 1 November 2013, Wickham re-joined Sheffield Wednesday in another loan move until 1 January 2014. Wickham scored on his return in the 5–2 win over Reading at Hillsborough on 2 November. Wickham again appeared on the score sheet scoring a brace of goals in the 2–1 win over Leicester City on 3 December. Four goals in four games in December 2013 earned Wickham a nomination for the December Championship Player of the Month award but he ultimately lost out to Leicester City's Danny Drinkwater. On 31 December 2013, his loan spell at Wednesday was extended by a further month, although his parent club prevented him from representing the Owls in the FA Cup. On 11 January 2014, he scored in Wednesday's 6–0 win over Yorkshire rivals Leeds United. After the game, he described the win as a "fantastic team performance" while saying that he was "unhappy with my own personal performance." He was recalled to his parent club on 27 January 2014.

On 26 February 2014, Wickham joined Football League Championship side Leeds United on loan until the end of the 2013–14 season. Wickham was handed the number 9 shirt for Leeds. He made his debut on 1 March 2014 in a 1–1 draw away to Queens Park Rangers at Loftus Road.

==== Return to Sunderland ====
On 24 March, Wickham was recalled from his loan after playing four games for Leeds to bolster Sunderland's goal scoring options, with Steven Fletcher injured and Jozy Altidore badly out of form.

On 16 April, he scored two goals in a 2–2 draw with Manchester City at the City of Manchester Stadium. Three days later, he scored the club's first goal in Sunderland's 2–1 win against Chelsea at Stamford Bridge. On 27 April, he scored a brace to help Sunderland overcome Cardiff City 4–0, playing a pivotal role in Sunderland's late surge to try to avoid relegation. He was named Premier League Player of the Month for April. On 3 May, his cross assisted Sebastian Larsson's goal in a 1–0 win at Old Trafford, making it Sunderland's first win away to Manchester United since 1968.

On 4 October 2014, he scored his first goal of the season and assisted a Steven Fletcher goal in a 3–1 win over Stoke City. In December 2014, Connor Wickham agreed a new four-and-a-half-year deal with Sunderland.

=== Crystal Palace ===
On 3 August 2015, Wickham joined Crystal Palace on a five-year deal for an undisclosed fee, although some sources reported it as an initial £7 million, rising to a potential £9 million depending upon his performance. Wickham made his debut on 8 August 2015 as a second-half substitute in the 3–1 win at Norwich City.

In November 2016, Wickham sustained a serious knee injury which kept him out of first-team action until October 2018. He did not make an appearance in the starting line-up until January 2019, scoring the opening goal in a 2–0 fourth-round FA Cup win against Tottenham Hotspur.

In May 2019, Wickham signed a one-year extension to his existing contract keeping him at Palace until June 2021.

On 3 March 2021, he returned to the 2020–21 Crystal Palace match day squad, by being an unused substitute in a 0–0 draw against Manchester United in the Premier League.

==== Sheffield Wednesday (loan) ====
Wickham joined Sheffield Wednesday on a six-month loan deal on 31 January 2020.

=== Preston North End ===
Wickham was released by Palace after his contract expired at the end of the 2020–21 season. He joined Championship club Preston North End in September 2021 on a short-term deal until January 2022. He impressed on his debut but suffered a serious hamstring injury after five minutes of an EFL Cup tie in his second appearance and did not play for the club again. Wickham was released by Preston North End on 13 January 2022.

=== Milton Keynes Dons ===
On 21 January 2022, Wickham joined League One club Milton Keynes Dons on a short-term deal. He made his debut the following day, coming on as a 75th-minute substitute in a 1–0 home defeat to Doncaster Rovers. On 19 February 2022, Wickham scored his first goal for the club, the winning goal in a 2–1 away win over former club Sunderland. However, after limited opportunities, he was one of six players released by MK Dons at the end of the 2021–22 season.

=== Forest Green Rovers ===
On 3 August 2022, Wickham joined newly promoted League One club Forest Green Rovers on a short-term deal until January 2023. He left the club in January 2023 at the expiry of his contract, scoring 9 times in 20 total appearances for the club.

=== Cardiff City ===
On 14 February 2023, Championship club Cardiff City signed Wickham until the end of the season.

=== Charlton Athletic ===
On 8 March 2024, following a two-week training period with the club, Wickham joined League One club Charlton Athletic on a short-term contract until the end of the season. He scored his first goal for the club in a 1–1 draw at Cambridge United on 13 April 2024.

On 3 May 2024, it was confirmed that Wickham would leave Charlton Athletic when his contract expired.

=== Dubai City ===
In October 2025, after over a year without a club, Wickham joined UAE Second Division League club Dubai City.

== International career ==
Wickham has played age-group matches for England, but is also eligible for Northern Ireland, as his father was born there. Until he receives a full cap from England in a competitive game he remains eligible for other teams. His progress in the English Premier League was also monitored by former Republic of Ireland management duo of Martin O'Neill and Roy Keane, as his links to Northern Ireland mean that he also qualifies to play for the Republic of Ireland.

=== England U16 ===
Wickham has represented the England under-16 team and was also on stand-by for the under-17 squad during the 2008–09 season. He won the 2008 Victory Shield with England, scoring in the 2–0 final win over Scotland.

=== England U17 ===
On 11 August 2009, Wickham received a call-up to the under-17 squad, for their three-game FA International Tournament, which would take place later that month.

In May 2010, Wickham was included in the England U17 squad for the UEFA European U17 Championship in Liechtenstein. He was involved in two of the goals in England's 3–1 win against the Czech Republic in the group stage, with a convincing performance. He then played the full game in the second group match against Greece, once again playing well. Wickham was rested for the final group game of the tournament, but returned to face France in the semi-final. He scored both goals for England in a 2–1 victory, both left-footed, and both in the first half. Wickham scored the winner in a 2–1 victory over Spain in the final. He received the ball on the edge of the box before proceeding to beat two defenders and drill the ball low into the net. He was given the Golden Player award by UEFA for the best player in the tournament.

=== England U21 ===
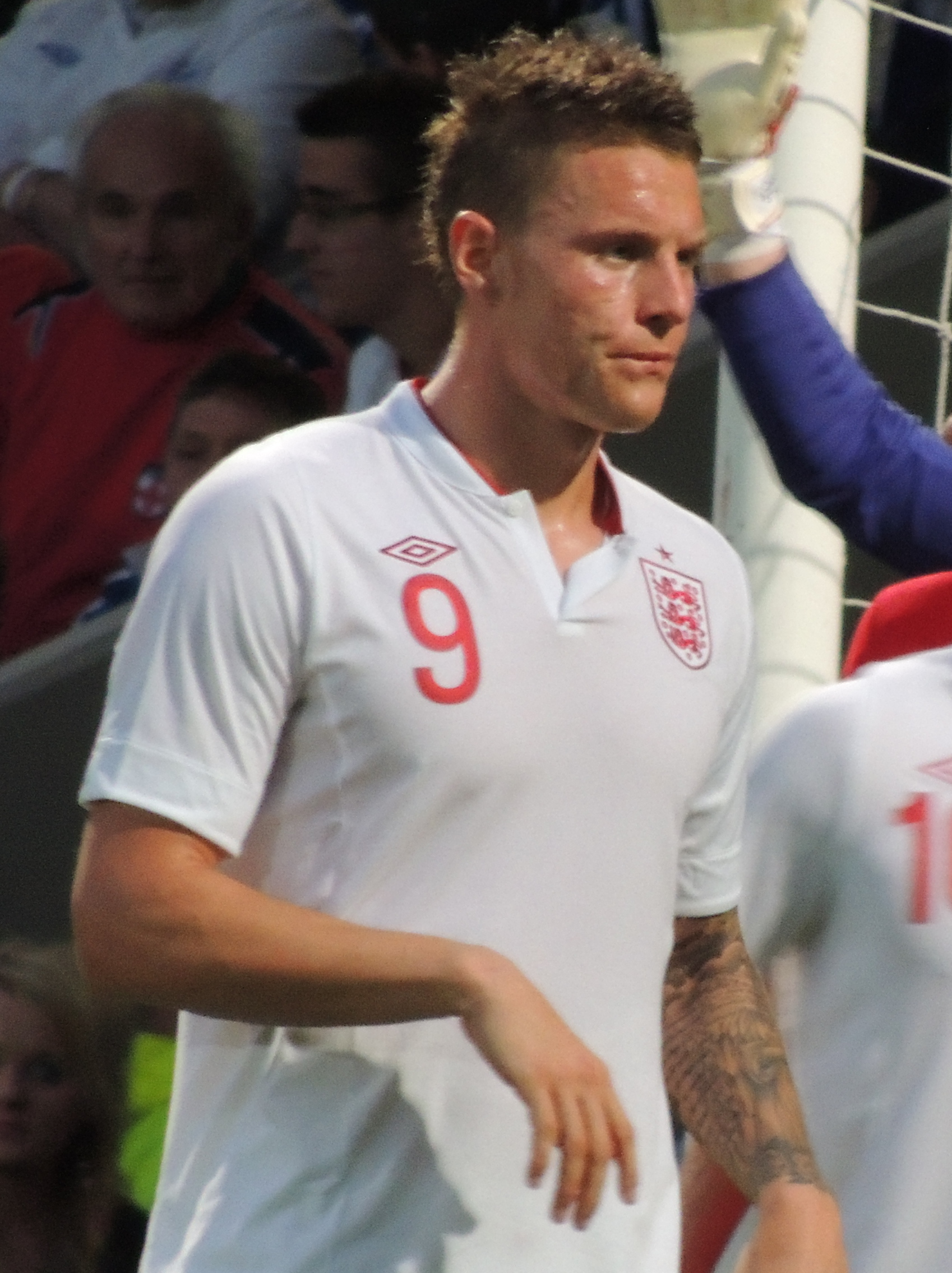
Wickham playing for England Under 21s in 2012

On 7 September 2010 England under-21 boss Stuart Pearce admitted that he had been monitoring Wickham's progress, and that he would consider calling him up to the under-21 squad once he had recovered from injury. On 15 November 2010 Pearce did name Wickham in the under-21s friendly match against Germany on 16 November 2010. In that game he came on as a 66th-minute substitute in a 2–0 defeat for England. Following that game, and the important experience Wickham gained, he returned to the England under-19 side. However, it would not be long before he was back in the fold for the under-21s.

On 14 March 2011 it was announced that Wickham had been included in the squad for England's games against Denmark and Iceland. He came on as a substitute in the game against Denmark, which England went on to win 4–0. The following Monday, Wickham started the game in a friendly against Iceland at Deepdale in Preston. It was his first start for the under-21s, and he played the full 90 minutes as England lost the game 2–1 to a very strong Iceland side that included a number of first team regulars. Wickham played as a lone striker in the game.

Prior to the Iceland game, Wickham admitted that he was hopeful of being included in the squad that would play in the summer's Euro 2011 under-21s tournament due to take place in June. Having been an instrumental figure in the success of the under-17's the previous summer, he felt he could repeat the feat at a higher level. He said:

It would be another summer tournament, and I want to win another tournament. It'll be different, but if we play to the potential that is in our team we are capable of beating anyone on our day. All the boys have taken me as part of the team and have treated me no differently to anyone else. They are a great bunch of lads and I'd be happy to spend the summer with them. Even just to be selected would be brilliant but to win it would be better. I don't see why we can't go on and really push this summer to win the tournament.

— Connor Wickham,

He scored his first goal for the under-21s on 10 September 2012, scoring the only goal of the game in a win against Norway in Chesterfield, ensuring England won their European Under-21 Championship qualifying group. He scored his second goal on 16 October, helping England to a 2–0 aggregate win in the play-off against Serbia.

== Sponsorship ==
In 2010, Wickham signed a sponsorship deal with British sportswear and equipment supplier, Umbro. He appeared in an advert for the new England kit in September 2010 and is one of the flagship wearers of Umbro's GT range of football boots.

== Career statistics ==
As of match played 21 May 2026

Appearances and goals by club, season and competition
Club	Season	League			FA Cup		League Cup		Other		Total	
Club	Season	Division	Apps	Goals	Apps	Goals	Apps	Goals	Apps	Goals	Apps	Goals
Ipswich Town	2008–09	Championship	2	0	0	0	0	0	—		2	0
Ipswich Town	2009–10	Championship	26	4	1	0	2	2	—		29	6
Ipswich Town	2010–11	Championship	37	9	1	0	3	0	—		41	9
Ipswich Town	Total		65	13	2	0	5	2	0	0	72	15
Sunderland	2011–12	Premier League	16	1	2	0	1	0	—		19	1
Sunderland	2012–13	Premier League	12	0	2	1	0	0	—		14	1
Sunderland	2013–14	Premier League	15	5	1	0	2	2	—		18	7
Sunderland	2014–15	Premier League	36	5	3	0	1	1	—		40	6
Sunderland	Total		79	11	8	1	4	3	0	0	91	15
Sheffield Wednesday (loan)	2012–13	Championship	6	1	0	0	0	0	—		6	1
Sheffield Wednesday (loan)	2013–14	Championship	11	8	0	0	0	0	—		11	8
Leeds United (loan)	2013–14	Championship	5	0	0	0	0	0	—		5	0
Crystal Palace	2015–16	Premier League	21	5	3	1	0	0	—		24	6
Crystal Palace	2016–17	Premier League	8	2	0	0	2	1	—		10	3
Crystal Palace	2017–18	Premier League	0	0	0	0	0	0	—		0	0
Crystal Palace	2018–19	Premier League	6	0	2	1	0	0	—		8	1
Crystal Palace	2019–20	Premier League	6	1	1	0	1	0	—		8	1
Crystal Palace	2020–21	Premier League	0	0	0	0	0	0	—		0	0
Crystal Palace	Total		41	8	6	2	3	1	0	0	50	11
Sheffield Wednesday (loan)	2019–20	Championship	13	2	0	0	—		—		13	2
Preston North End	2021–22	Championship	1	0	0	0	1	0	—		2	0
Milton Keynes Dons	2021–22	League One	13	1	—		—		2 (Note: Appearance(s) in 2021–22 EFL League One play-offs.)	0	15	1
Forest Green Rovers	2022–23	League One	16	6	2	3	1	0	1 (Note: Appearances in EFL Trophy)	0	20	9
Cardiff City	2022–23	Championship	12	1	—		—		0	0	12	1
Charlton Athletic	2023–24	League One	4	1	—		—		—		4	1
Dubai City	2025–26	UAE First Division League	6	2	—		—		—		6	2
Career total			272	54	18	6	14	6	3	0	307	66

== Honours ==
Crystal Palace

- FA Cup runner-up: 2015–16

England U16

- Victory Shield: 2008

England U17

- UEFA European Under-17 Championship: 2010

Individual

- Ipswich Town Young Player of the Year: 2008–09
- UEFA European Under-17 Championship Golden Player: 2010
- UEFA European Under-17 Championship Team of the Tournament: 2010
- Football League Championship Player of the Month: February 2011
- Football League Young Player of the Month: April 2010
- Football League Young Player of the Year: 2011
- Championship Apprentice Award: 2011
- Premier League Player of the Month: April 2014
- Sunderland Supporters' Young Player of the Year: 2014–15
