= 2009–10 Aris Thessaloniki F.C. season =

Aris Thessaloniki
- President: Thanasis Athanasiadis
- Manager: Iomar Mazinho (until 2 November 2009); Héctor Cúper (from 3 November 2009)
- Stadium: Kleanthis Vikelidis Stadium
- Super League: 4th (5th in regular season)
- Greek Cup: Finalist
- Top goalscorer: League: Javier Cámpora (13); All: Javier Cámpora (15)
Home colours	Away colours

The members of Lesxi Filon Ari elected Thanasis Athanasiadis as the new president of Aris Thessaloniki in the elections that took place in May.

The club finished 5th in regular season of Super League and 4th after playoffs. Also, the club reached in the final of Greek Cup where lost by Panathinaikos. Aris Thessaloniki's fans made the biggest movement of fans in Greece for the final.

Aris Thessaloniki started the season with Iomar Mazinho. In November Mazinho removed and Héctor Cúper was the manager for the rest of the season.

== First-team squad ==
#	Name	Nationality	Position(s)	Date of birth (age)	Signed from
Goalkeepers
1	Michalis Sifakis	(Greece)	GK	9 September 1984 (aged 25)	(Greece) OFI Crete
28	Michal Peškovič	(Slovakia)	GK	8 February 1982 (aged 28)	(Poland) Polonia Bytom
40	Stivi Frashëri	(Albania)	GK	29 August 1990 (aged 19)	Club's Academy
86	Renato Piovezan	(Brazil) / (Italy)	GK	24 April 1986 (aged 24)	(Italy) Prato
Defenders
2	Darcy Dolce Neto	(Brazil)	RB / RW	7 February 1981 (aged 29)	(Brazil) Santos
3	Carlos Arano	(Argentina) / (Spain)	LB / LM	6 May 1980 (aged 30)	(Argentina) Huracán
4	Efthymis Kouloucheris (vice-captain)	(Greece)	CB / DM	10 March 1981 (aged 29)	(Greece) Olympiacos
5	Ronaldo Guiaro	(Brazil) / (Portugal)	CB	18 February 1974 (aged 36)	(Brazil) Santos
15	Cristian Nasuti	(Argentina) / (Italy)	CB	6 September 1982 (aged 27)	(Argentina) River Plate
22	Thomas Grekos	(Greece)	RB / RM	18 April 1991 (aged 19)	Club's Academy
25	César Ortiz	(Spain)	CB	30 January 1989 (aged 21)	(Spain) Atlético Madrid B
27	Charalampos Oikonomopoulos	(Greece)	CB / DM	9 January 1991 (aged 19)	Club's Academy
29	Giannis Agtzidis	(Greece)	LB	14 October 1992 (aged 17)	Club's Academy
32	Kristi Vangjeli	(Albania)	CB / RB / LB	5 September 1985 (aged 24)	Club's Academy
47	Mavroudis Bougaidis	(Greece)	CB / LB / DM	1 June 1993 (aged 16)	Club's Academy
Midfielders
6	Mehdi Nafti	(Tunisia) / (France)	DM	28 November 1978 (aged 31)	(England) Birmingham City
8	Nacho García	(Bolivia)	CM / DM	17 December 1980 (aged 29)	(Bolivia) Oriente Petrolero
9	Darío Fernández	(Argentina) / (Italy)	CM / AM / LM	24 September 1978 (aged 31)	(Israel) Beitar Jerusalem
11	Freddy Adu	(United States) / (Ghana)	AM / LM / RM	2 June 1989 (aged 20)	(Portugal) Benfica
17	Camel Meriem	(France) / (Algeria)	AM / RW / LW	18 October 1979 (aged 30)	Free Agent
55	Sakis Prittas	(Greece)	CM / DM	9 January 1979 (aged 31)	(Greece) Iraklis
Forwards
7	Toni Calvo	(Spain)	RW / LW	28 March 1987 (aged 23)	(Spain) Barcelona B
10	Sergio Koke (captain)	(Spain)	ST / SS	27 April 1983 (aged 27)	(France) Olympique de Marseille
14	Eddie Johnson	(United States)	ST / LW	31 March 1984 (aged 26)	(England) Fulham
18	Javier Cámpora	(Argentina)	ST	7 January 1980 (aged 30)	(Mexico) Chiapas
20	Javito Peral	(Spain)	LW / RW	4 November 1983 (aged 26)	(Spain) Barcelona B
23	Christos Aravidis	(Greece)	ST / LW / RW	13 March 1987 (aged 23)	(Greece) Panionios
33	Stavros Labriakos	(Greece)	ST	30 November 1975 (aged 34)	(Greece) Skoda Xanthi
99	Ian Daly	(Republic of Ireland) / (England)	ST	29 March 1990 (aged 20)	(England) Manchester City U18

== Transfers and loans ==
=== Transfers in ===
Entry date	Position	No.	Player	From club	Fee	Ref.
June 2009	MF	6	(Tunisia) / (France) Mehdi Nafti	(England) Birmingham City	Free	
June 2009	FW	13	(Uruguay) Sebastián Abreu	(Argentina) River Plate	Free	
June 2009	DF	3	(Argentina) / (Spain) Carlos Arano	(Argentina) Huracán	Free	
June 2009	FW	99	(Republic of Ireland) / (England) Ian Daly	(England) Manchester City U18	Free	
July 2009	FW	23	(Greece) Christos Aravidis	(Greece) Panionios	Free	
July 2009	MF	12	(Greece) Vasilios Rovas	(Greece) Atromitos	Free	
July 2009	DF	25	(Brazil) / (Portugal) Flávio Pinto	(Greece) Asteras Tripolis	Free	
July 2009	GK	28	(Slovakia) Michal Peškovič	(Poland) Polonia Bytom	Free	
August 2009	MF	19	(Argentina) Pitu Garcia	Free Agent	Free	
August 2009	GK	86	(Brazil) / (Italy) Renato Piovezan	(Italy) Prato	Free	
February 2010	MF	17	(France) / (Algeria) Camel Meriem	Free Agent	Free	

=== Transfers out ===
Exit date	Position	No.	Player	To club	Fee	Ref.
June 2009	FW	19	(Greece) Thanasis Papazoglou	(Greece) PAOK	Released	
June 2009	DF	15	(Greece) Nikos Karabelas	(Greece) AEK Athens	Released	
July 2009	FW	12	(Uruguay) / (Spain) Mario Regueiro	Free Agent	Released	
July 2009	DF	4	(Uruguay) / (Italy) Alejandro Lembo	Free Agent	Released	
July 2009	GK	31	(Greece) Dimitrios Karatziovalis	(Greece) Doxa Drama	Released	
July 2009	MF	9	(Brazil) / (Italy) Thiago Gentil	(Brazil) Coritiba	Released	
July 2009	FW	14	(Spain) Felipe Sanchón	(Italy) Udinese	Released	
August 2009	FW	17	(Poland) Piotr Włodarczyk	Free Agent	Released	
August 2009	MF	11	(Brazil) Diogo Siston	Free Agent	Released	
August 2009	DF	26	(Bosnia and Herzegovina) / (France) Sanel Jahić	(Greece) AEK Athens	590.000 €	
November 2009	DF	25	(Brazil) / (Portugal) Flávio Pinto	Free Agent	Released	
January 2010	FW	13	(Uruguay) Sebastián Abreu	Free Agent	Released	
January 2010	DF	21	(France) Valentin Roberge	Free Agent	Released	
February 2010	MF	19	(Argentina) Pitu Garcia	Free Agent	Released	

=== Loans in ===
Start date	End date	Position	No.	Player	From club	Fee	Ref.
June 2009	January 2010	MF	11	(Argentina) Leandro Gracián	(Argentina) Boca Juniors	250.000 €	
June 2009	End of season	DF	15	(Argentina) / (Italy) Cristian Nasuti	(Argentina) River Plate	None	
August 2009	End of season	MF	9	(Argentina) / (Italy) Darío Fernández	(Israel) Beitar Jerusalem	150.000 €	
January 2010	End of season	FW	14	(United States) Eddie Johnson	(England) Fulham	None	
January 2010	May 2011	MF	11	(United States) / (Ghana) Freddy Adu	(Portugal) Benfica	None	
February 2010	End of season	DF	25	(Spain) César Ortiz	(Spain) Atlético Madrid B	None	

=== Loans out ===
Start date	End date	Position	No.	Player	To club	Fee	Ref.
August 2009	End of season	MF	30	(Argentina) Roberto Battión	(Argentina) Banfield	None	
January 2010	End of season	MF	12	(Greece) Vasilios Rovas	(Greece) PAS Giannina	None	

== Competitions ==
=== Overall ===
Competition	Started round	Current position / round	Final position / round	First match	Last match
Super League	Matchday 1	—	4th	22 August 2009	19 May 2010
Regular Season	Matchday 1	—	5th	22 August 2009	18 April 2010
Play-offs	Matchday 1	—	4th	28 April 2010	19 May 2010
Greek Cup	Fourth round	—	Finalist	28 October 2009	24 April 2010

Updated to match played 19 May 2010
Source: Competitions

=== Overview ===
Competition	Record							
Competition	G	W	D	L	GF	GA	GD	Win %
Super League	36	14	12	10	43	37	+6	38.89
Greek Cup	7	4	2	1	14	7	+7	57.14
Total	43	18	14	11	57	34	+23	41.86

Updated to match played 19 May 2010
Source: Competitions

Super League	Record							
Super League	G	W	D	L	GF	GA	GD	Win %
Regular Season	30	12	10	8	35	28	+7	40.00
Play-offs	6	2	2	2	8	9	−1	33.33
Total	36	14	12	10	43	37	+6	38.89

Updated to match played 19 May 2010
Source: Competitions

==== Managers' overview ====
===== Iomar Mazinho =====
Competition	Record							
Competition	G	W	D	L	GF	GA	GD	Win %
Super League	9	3	5	1	10	8	+2	33.33
Greek Cup	1	1	0	0	4	3	+1	100.00
Total	10	4	5	1	14	11	+3	40.00

Updated to match played 31 October 2009
Source: Competitions

===== Héctor Cúper =====
Competition	Record							
Competition	G	W	D	L	GF	GA	GD	Win %
Super League	27	11	7	9	33	29	+4	40.74
Greek Cup	6	3	2	1	10	4	+6	50.00
Total	33	14	9	10	43	33	+10	42.42

Updated to match played 19 May 2010
Source: Competitions

=== Super League ===
==== Regular season ====
===== League table =====
Pos	Team	Pld	W	D	L	GF	GA	GD	Pts	Qualification or relegation
3	PAOK	30	19	5	6	41	16	+25	62	Qualification for the Play-offs
4	AEK Athens	30	15	8	7	43	31	+12	53	Qualification for the Play-offs
5	Aris	30	12	10	8	35	28	+7	46	Qualification for the Play-offs
6	Kavala	30	10	9	11	31	32	−1	39	
7	Atromitos	30	10	8	12	34	36	−2	38	

Source: Super League Greece
Rules for classification: 1) Points; 2) Head-to-head points; 3) Head-to-head goal difference; 4) Play-offs (neutral ground).
(Note: Criterion 4 is only used if needed to decide champion, teams for relegation or teams for UEFA competitions).

===== Results summary =====
Overall								Home						Away					
Pld	W	D	L	GF	GA	GD	Pts	W	D	L	GF	GA	GD	W	D	L	GF	GA	GD
30	12	10	8	35	28	+7	46	9	4	2	17	8	+9	3	6	6	18	20	−2

Last updated: 18 April 2010.
Source: Super League

===== Results by matchday =====
Matchday	1	2	3	4	5	6	7	8	9	10	11	12	13	14	15	16	17	18	19	20	21	22	23	24	25	26	27	28	29	30
Ground	H	A	H	A	H	A	A	H	A	H	A	H	A	H	H	A	H	A	H	A	H	H	A	H	A	H	A	H	A	A
Result	W	D	W	L	W	D	D	D	D	D	L	D	W	L	W	W	W	W	D	L	L	W	L	W	D	W	D	W	L	L
Position	4	6	3	5	4	5	5	3	5	6	9	9	6	9	7	4	4	4	4	4	5	5	5	5	5	5	5	5	5	5

Updated to match(es) played on 18 April 2010. Source: Super League
A = Away; H = Home; W = Win; D = Draw; L = Loss; P = Postponed

===== Matches =====
22 August 2009 1	Aris Thessaloniki	1 – 0	Atromitos	Thessaloniki
16:45	Cristian Nasuti 68'	Report		Stadium: Kleanthis Vikelidis Stadium; Attendance: 12.208; Referee: Ilias Spathas

29 August 2009 2	Iraklis	2 – 2	Aris Thessaloniki	Thessaloniki
19:00	Victoraș Iacob 26'; Denis Epstein 59'	Report	Javier Cámpora 21', 38'	Stadium: Kaftanzoglio Stadium; Attendance: 7.745; Referee: Georgios Daloukas

12 September 2009 3	Aris Thessaloniki	1 – 0	PAS Giannina	Thessaloniki
19:00	Mehdi Nafti 3'	Report		Stadium: Kleanthis Vikelidis Stadium; Attendance: 13.383; Referee: Vassilios Paboridis

20 September 2009 4	Panathinaikos	2 – 1	Aris Thessaloniki	Athens
19:00	Sebastián Abreu 42' (o.g.); Kostas Katsouranis 83'	Report	Ronaldo Guiaro 36'	Stadium: Athens Olympic Stadium; Attendance: 27.125; Referee: Michail Dakos

26 September 2009 5	Aris Thessaloniki	1 – 0	Skoda Xanthi	Thessaloniki
19:00	Sebastián Abreu 90+2'	Report		Stadium: Kleanthis Vikelidis Stadium; Attendance: 13.117; Referee: Stavros Tritsonis

3 October 2009 6	Panthrakikos	1 – 1	Aris Thessaloniki	Komotini
16:45	João Fajardo 12'	Report	Flávio Pinto 46'	Stadium: Komotini Municipal Stadium; Attendance: 4.935; Referee: Ilias Spathas

17 October 2009 7	Ergotelis	0 – 0	Aris Thessaloniki	Heraklion
16:45		Report		Stadium: Pankritio Stadium; Attendance: 2.651; Referee: Georgios Stathopoulos

25 October 2009 8	Aris Thessaloniki	1 – 1	AEK Athens	Thessaloniki
16:45	Sebastián Abreu 5'	Report	Ignacio Scocco 48'	Stadium: Kleanthis Vikelidis Stadium; Attendance: 14.770; Referee: Konstantinos Papastamatis

31 October 2009 9	AEL	2 – 2	Aris Thessaloniki	Larissa
16:45	Aleksandar Simić 8'; Salim Tuama 27'	Report	Sebastián Abreu 25'; Sergio Koke 33'	Stadium: Alcazar Stadium; Attendance: 3.510; Referee: Ilias Spathas

7 November 2009 10	Aris Thessaloniki	0 – 0	Kavala	Thessaloniki
16:45		Report		Stadium: Kleanthis Vikelidis Stadium; Attendance: 11.365; Referee: Mihail Koukoulakis

22 November 2009 11	PAOK	4 – 1	Aris Thessaloniki	Thessaloniki
19:00	Vladimir Ivić 20'; Zlatan Muslimović 45+1', 60'; Víctor Vitolo 48'	Report	Darcy Dolce Neto 85'	Stadium: Toumba Stadium; Attendance: 23.034; Referee: Dimitrios Kalopoulos

29 November 2009 12	Aris Thessaloniki	1 – 1	Panionios	Thessaloniki
16:45	Darcy Dolce Neto 82'	Report	Bennard Kumordzi 90+3'	Stadium: Kleanthis Vikelidis Stadium; Attendance: 12.562; Referee: Petros Konstantineas

5 December 2009 13	Levadiakos	0 – 2	Aris Thessaloniki	Livadeia
14:45		Report	Javier Cámpora 41'; Mehdi Nafti 78'	Stadium: Levadia Municipal Stadium; Attendance: 2.041; Referee: Georgios Stathopoulos

12 December 2009 14	Aris Thessaloniki	0 – 1	Asteras Tripolis	Thessaloniki
16:45		Report	Chigozie Udoji 12'	Stadium: Kleanthis Vikelidis Stadium; Attendance: 10.112; Referee: Marios Labropoulos

20 December 2009 15	Aris Thessaloniki	1 – 0	Olympiacos	Thessaloniki
19:00	Javier Cámpora 69'	Report		Stadium: Kleanthis Vikelidis Stadium; Attendance: 14.616; Referee: Vassilios Paboridis

5 January 2010 16	Atromitos	0 – 3	Aris Thessaloniki	Athens
19:00		Report	Toni Calvo 14'; Javier Cámpora 23', 69'	Stadium: Peristeri Stadium; Attendance: 2.172; Referee: Anastasios Sidiropoulos

10 January 2010 17	Aris Thessaloniki	4 – 2	Iraklis	Thessaloniki
16:45	Javier Cámpora 31', 54'; Toni Calvo 45+3', 56'	Report	Denis Epstein 39'; Mauro Milano 87'	Stadium: Kleanthis Vikelidis Stadium; Attendance: 15.910; Referee: Georgios Stathopoulos

17 January 2010 18	PAS Giannina	0 – 1	Aris Thessaloniki	Ioannina
16:45		Report	Mehdi Nafti 51'	Stadium: Zosimades Stadium; Attendance: 6.463; Referee: Andreas Pappas

24 January 2010 19	Aris Thessaloniki	0 – 0	Panathinaikos	Thessaloniki
16:45		Report		Stadium: Kleanthis Vikelidis Stadium; Attendance: 17.802; Referee: Ilias Spathas

31 January 2010 20	Skoda Xanthi	2 – 1	Aris Thessaloniki	Xanthi
14:30	Marcelinho 15'; Nathan Ellington 35'	Report	Eddie Johnson 90+1'	Stadium: Xanthi FC Arena; Attendance: 1.258; Referee: Anastasios Kakos

6 February 2010 21	Aris Thessaloniki	0 – 2	Panthrakikos	Thessaloniki
16:45		Report	Fotios Papoulis 42'; Bertrand Robert 76'	Stadium: Kleanthis Vikelidis Stadium; Referee: Christos Mitsios

14 February 2010 22	Aris Thessaloniki	2 – 1	Ergotelis	Thessaloniki
16:45	Sergio Koke 29'; Freddy Adu 45+1'	Report	Beto 2'	Stadium: Kleanthis Vikelidis Stadium; Attendance: 9.258; Referee: Athanasios Giahos

21 February 2010 23	AEK Athens	1 – 0	Aris Thessaloniki	Athens
16:45	Pantelis Kafes 46'	Report		Stadium: Athens Olympic Stadium; Attendance: 18.294; Referee: Mihail Tsiniaris

28 February 2010 24	Aris Thessaloniki	2 – 0	AEL	Thessaloniki
16:45	Mehdi Nafti 32'; Javier Cámpora 35'	Report		Stadium: Kleanthis Vikelidis Stadium; Attendance: 12.013; Referee: Georgios Stathopoulos

6 March 2010 25	Kavala	1 – 1	Aris Thessaloniki	Kavala
16:45	Serge Dié 78'	Report	Toni Calvo 8'	Stadium: Anthi Karagianni Stadium; Attendance: 2.762; Referee: Dimitis Kyrkos

14 March 2010 26	Aris Thessaloniki	2 – 0	PAOK	Thessaloniki
19:00	Javier Cámpora 22', 64'	Report		Stadium: Kleanthis Vikelidis Stadium; Attendance: 17.353; Referee: Ilias Spathas

21 March 2010 27	Panionios	1 – 1	Aris Thessaloniki	Athens
19:00	Davor Kukec 81'	Report	Eddie Johnson 11'	Stadium: Nea Smyrni Stadium; Attendance: 2.708; Referee: Marios Labropoulos

28 March 2010 28	Aris Thessaloniki	1 – 0	Levadiakos	Thessaloniki
19:00	Darcy Dolce Neto 64'	Report		Stadium: Kleanthis Vikelidis Stadium; Attendance: 10.821; Referee: Andreas Pappas

11 April 2010 29	Asteras Tripolis	2 – 1	Aris Thessaloniki	Tripoli
19:00	Éder Luiz 5'; Sebastián Bartolini 15'	Report	Sergio Koke 84'	Stadium: Theodoros Kolokotronis Stadium; Attendance: 2.035; Referee: Konstantinos Papastamatis

18 April 2010 30	Olympiacos	2 – 1	Aris Thessaloniki	Piraeus
19:00	Michał Żewłakow 33'; Enzo Maresca 45+5'	Report	Toni Calvo 43'	Stadium: Karaiskakis Stadium; Attendance: 14.217; Referee: Mihail Dakos

==== Play-offs ====
Team that finished fifth in Regular Season started Play-offs with 0 points. Every other team's points is the difference from fifth placed team divided with 5.

The teams started Play-offs with the following points:

- Olympiacos – 4 points [(64–46) / 5 = 3.6, rounded to 4]
- PAOK – 3 points [(62–46) / 5 = 3.2, rounded to 3]
- AEK Athens – 1 point [(53–46) / 5 = 1.4, rounded to 1]
- Aris Thessaloniki – 0 points [(46–46) / 5 = 0]

===== League table =====
Pos	Team	Pld	W	D	L	GF	GA	GD	Pts	Qualification
2	PAOK	6	4	1	1	7	3	+4	16	Qualification for the Champions League third qualifying round
3	AEK Athens	6	2	2	2	8	7	+1	9	Qualification for the Europa League play-off round
4	Aris Thessaloniki	6	2	2	2	8	9	−1	8 (Note: Head-to-head record: Aris–Olympiacos 2–0, Olympiacos–Aris 0–0.)	Qualification for the Europa League third qualifying round
5	Olympiacos	6	1	1	4	3	7	−4	8	Qualification for the Europa League second qualifying round

Updated to match(es) played on unknown. Source: Superleague Greece
Rules for classification: 1) points; 2) head-to-head points; 3) head-to-head goal difference; 4) head-to-head goals scored; 5) goal difference; 6) number of goals scored.

===== Results summary =====
Overall								Home						Away					
Pld	W	D	L	GF	GA	GD	Pts	W	D	L	GF	GA	GD	W	D	L	GF	GA	GD
6	2	2	2	8	9	−1	8	2	1	0	6	3	+3	0	1	2	2	6	−4

Last updated: 19 May 2010.
Source: Super League

===== Matches =====
28 April 2010 1	Aris Thessaloniki	2 – 0	Olympiacos	Thessaloniki
19:00	Eddie Johnson 40', 90+3'	Report		Stadium: Kleanthis Vikelidis Stadium; Attendance: 6.639; Referee: Georgios Daloukas

2 May 2009 2	PAOK	2 – 0	Aris Thessaloniki	Thessaloniki
21:15	Vladimir Ivić 26'; Mirko Savini 36'	Report		Stadium: Toumba Stadium; Attendance: 23.412; Referee: Georgios Stathopoulos

9 May 2010 3	AEK Athens	4 – 2	Aris Thessaloniki	Athens
16:45	Rafik Djebbour 27'; Leonardo 75', 84'; Ignacio Scocco 77'	Report	Javier Cámpora 56'; Eddie Johnson 72'	Stadium: Athens Olympic Stadium; Attendance: 6.961; Referee: Mihail Koukoulakis

12 May 2010 4	Aris Thessaloniki	1 – 1	AEK Athens	Thessaloniki
19:00	Sakis Prittas 47'	Report	Leonardo 90+3'	Stadium: Kleanthis Vikelidis Stadium; Attendance: 6.357; Referee: Anastasios Kakos

16 May 2010 5	Olympiacos	0 – 0	Aris Thessaloniki	Piraeus
19:00		Report		Stadium: Karaiskakis Stadium; Attendance: 7.088; Referee: Mihail Dakos

19 May 2010 26	Aris Thessaloniki	3 – 2	PAOK	Thessaloniki
19:00	Stelios Malezas 12' (o.g.); Javito Peral 32'; Javier Cámpora 63'	Report	Thanasis Papazoglou 22'; Bruno Cirillo 45+1'	Stadium: Kleanthis Vikelidis Stadium; Attendance: 6.962; Referee: Georgios Stathopoulos

=== Greek Football Cup ===
==== Fourth Round ====
28 October 2009 Fourth Round	Aspropyrgos	3 – 4	Aris Thessaloniki	Athens
18:00	Athanasios Prittas 10' (o.g.); Giorgos Xydis 22', 68'	https://www.epo.gr/media/files/ARXEIO_KYPELLO/4_fasi_2009-2010.pdf (in Greek)	Pitu García 16'; Sebastián Abreu 60', 83'; Javito 78'	Stadium: Aspropyrgos Municipal Stadium; Referee: Michalis Voskakis

==== Fifth Round ====
13 January 2010 Fifth Round	Aris Thessaloniki	2 – 0	Asteras Tripolis	Thessaloniki
16:00	Javier Cámpora 32'; Toni Calvo 81'	https://www.epo.gr/media/files/ARXEIO_KYPELLO/5_fasi_2009-2010.pdf (in Greek)		Stadium: Kleanthis Vikelidis Stadium; Referee: Konstantinos Papastamatis

==== Quarter-finals ====
10 February 2009 Quarter-finals	Skoda Xanthi	1 – 1	Aris Thessaloniki	Xanthi
16:00	Florin Stângă 70'	https://www.epo.gr/media/files/ARXEIO_KYPELLO/6_fasi_2009-2010.pdf (in Greek)	Darcy Dolce Neto 90+4'	Stadium: Xanthi FC Arena; Referee: Georgios Daloukas

==== Quarter-finals Replay ====
17 February 2010 Quarter-finals	Aris Thessaloniki	3 – 0	Skoda Xanthi	Thessaloniki
15:00	Javier Cámpora 17'; Freddy Adu 22'; Sergio Koke 65'	https://www.epo.gr/media/files/ARXEIO_KYPELLO/6_fasi_2009-2010.pdf (in Greek)		Stadium: Kleanthis Vikelidis Stadium; Referee: Georgios Stathopoulos

==== Semi-finals ====
17 March 2010 First Leg	Aris Thessaloniki	3 – 1	Kavala	Thessaloniki
16:00	Sergio Koke 26' (pen.), 68'; Javito Peral 85'	https://www.epo.gr/media/files/ARXEIO_KYPELLO/7_fasi_2009-2010.pdf (in Greek)	Benjamin Onwuachi 45'	Stadium: Kleanthis Vikelidis Stadium; Referee: Anastasios Kakos

25 March 2010 Second Leg	Kavala	1 – 1 (2–4 agg.)	Aris Thessaloniki	Kavala
16:00	Serge Dié 57'	https://www.epo.gr/media/files/ARXEIO_KYPELLO/7_fasi_2009-2010.pdf (in Greek)	Sergio Koke 44'	Stadium: Anthi Karagianni Stadium; Referee: Georgios Daloukas

==== Final ====
The 68th Greek Cup final was played at Athens Olympic Stadium on 24 April 2010.

24 April 2010
20:30

Panathinaikos	1 – 0	Aris
Leto 63'

Athens Olympic Stadium, Marousi
Referee: Anastasios Kakos (Corfu)

Panathinaikos
Aris

PANATHINAIKOS:
GK	27	(Greece) Alexandros Tzorvas
DF	24	(Greece) Loukas Vintra
DF	31	(Greece) Nikos Spiropoulos	(yellow card) 30'
DF	8	(France) Cédric Kanté
MF	29	(Greece) Kostas Katsouranis
MF	15	(Brazil) Gilberto Silva (c)
MF	23	(Mozambique) Simão Mate Junior	(yellow card) 59'
MF	7	(Greece) Sotiris Ninis		(substituted off) 66'
MF	11	(Argentina) Sebastián Leto	(yellow card) 40'	(substituted off) 78'
FW	5	(Greece) Dimitris Salpingidis		(substituted off) 62'
FW	9	(France) Djibril Cissé
Substitutes:
DF	22	(Greece) Stergos Marinos		(substituted on) 66'
MF	26	(Greece) Giorgos Karagounis		(substituted on) 62'
MF	17	(Greece) Lazaros Christodoulopoulos		(substituted on) 78'
Manager:
(Greece) Nikos Nioplias

ARIS:
GK	1	(Greece) Michalis Sifakis
DF	2	(Brazil) Darcy Dolce Neto
DF	32	(Albania) Kristi Vangjeli
DF	15	(Argentina) Cristian Nasuti
DF	5	(Brazil) Ronaldo Guiaro
MF	55	(Greece) Thanasis Prittas	(yellow card) 47'
MF	6	(Tunisia) Mehdi Nafti		(substituted off) 74'
MF	7	(Spain) Toni Calvo	(yellow card) 12'	(substituted off) 83'
MF	17	(France) Camel Meriem		(substituted off) 66'
FW	18	(Argentina) Javier Cámpora
FW	10	(Spain) Sergio Koke (c)
Substitutes:
MF	9	(Argentina) Dario Fernandez		(substituted on) 74'
MF	20	(Spain) Javito		(substituted on) 66'
FW	11	(United States) Freddy Adu		(substituted on) 83'
Manager:
(Argentina) Héctor Cúper

MATCH OFFICIALS

- Assistant referees:
  - K. Dallas
  - D. Tatsis
- Fourth official: M. Koukoulakis

MATCH RULES

- 90 minutes.
- 30 minutes of extra time if necessary.
- Penalty shootout if scores still level.
- Seven named substitutes.
- Maximum of 3 substitutions.

== Squad statistics ==
=== Appearances ===
Players with no appearances not included in the list.

As of match played 19 May 2010

#	Position	Nat.	Player	Super League	Greek Cup	Total
1	GK	(Greece)	Michalis Sifakis	30	6	36
2	DF	(Brazil)	Darcy Dolce Neto	31	6	37
3	DF	(Argentina) / (Spain)	Carlos Arano	29	6	35
4	DF	(Greece)	Efthymis Kouloucheris	18	1	19
5	DF	(Brazil) / (Portugal)	Ronaldo Guiaro	27	6	33
6	MF	(Tunisia) / (France)	Mehdi Nafti	24	6	30
7	FW	(Spain)	Toni Calvo	31	5	36
8	MF	(Bolivia)	Nacho García	17	4	21
9	MF	(Argentina) / (Italy)	Darío Fernández	24	2	26
10	FW	(Spain)	Sergio Koke	32	7	39
11	MF	(United States) / (Ghana)	Freddy Adu	9	3	12
14	FW	(United States)	Eddie Johnson	16	5	21
15	DF	(Argentina) / (Italy)	Cristian Nasuti	28	6	34
17	MF	(France) / (Algeria)	Camel Meriem	9	4	13
18	FW	(Argentina)	Javier Cámpora	30	6	36
20	FW	(Spain)	Javito Peral	30	7	37
22	DF	(Greece)	Thomas Grekos	1	0	1
23	FW	(Greece)	Christos Aravidis	9	0	9
25	DF	(Spain)	César Ortiz	2	0	2
28	GK	(Slovakia)	Michal Peškovič	7	1	8
32	DF	(Albania)	Kristi Vangjeli	11	1	12
33	FW	(Greece)	Stavros Labriakos	11	1	12
55	MF	(Greece)	Sakis Prittas	19	7	26
99	FW	(Republic of Ireland) / (France)	Ian Daly	7	1	8
Players who left the club during this season
	DF	(Brazil) / (Portugal)	Flávio Pinto	9	1	10
	FW	(Uruguay)	Sebastián Abreu	8	1	9
	MF	(Argentina)	Leandro Gracián	12	1	13
	DF	(France)	Valentin Roberge	5	1	6
	MF	(Greece)	Vasilios Rovas	5	1	6
	MF	(Argentina)	Pitu Garcia	10	1	11
Total				36	7	43

=== Goals ===
As of match played 19 May 2010

Ranking	Position	Nat.	Player	Super League (Note: included goals for Play-Offs)	Greek Cup	Total
1	FW	(Argentina)	Javier Cámpora	13	2	15
2	FW	(Spain)	Sergio Koke	3	4	7
3	FW	(Spain)	Toni Calvo	5	1	6
4	FW	(United States)	Eddie Johnson	5	0	5
4	FW	(Uruguay)	Sebastián Abreu	3	2	5
6	MF	(Tunisia) / (France)	Mehdi Nafti	4	0	4
6	DF	(Brazil)	Darcy Dolce Neto	3	1	4
8	FW	(Spain)	Javito Peral	1	2	3
9	MF	(United States) / (Ghana)	Freddy Adu	1	1	2
10	DF	(Argentina) / (Italy)	Cristian Nasuti	1	0	1
10	DF	(Brazil) / (Portugal)	Ronaldo Guiaro	1	0	1
10	DF	(Brazil) / (Portugal)	Flávio Pinto	1	0	1
10	MF	(Greece)	Sakis Prittas	1	0	1
10	MF	(Argentina) / (Portugal)	Pitu Garcia	0	1	1
Own Goals				1	0	1
Total				43	14	57

=== Clean sheets ===
As of match played 19 May 2010

#	Nat.	Player	Super League	Greek Cup	Total
1	(Greece)	Michalis Sifakis	14	2	16
28	(Slovakia)	Michal Peškovič	2	0	2
Total			15 (Note: In Matchday 24 against AEL, where Aris Thessaloniki won with 2-0, in the second half Michalis Sifakis were substitutioned out from Michal Peškovič. Both goalkeepers claimed the clean sheet.)	2	17
