= 2010 Greek Football Cup final =

2010 Greek Cup final
- Event: 2009–10 Greek Football Cup
Panathinaikos	Aris
1	0
- Date: 24 April 2010
- Venue: Olympic Stadium, Marousi, Athens
- Man of the Match: Sebastián Leto (Panathinaikos)
- Referee: Anastasios Kakos (Corfu)
- Attendance: 48,926
- Weather: Partly Cloudy; 15 °C (59 °F); 72% humidity

The 2010 Greek Cup final was the 66th final of the Greek Cup. The match took place on 24 April 2010 at the Olympic Stadium. The contesting teams were Panathinaikos and Aris. It was Panathinaikos' twenty eighth Greek Cup final in their 102-year history and Aris' ninth Greek Cup final in their 96 years of existence. Aris achieved a record of most mass movement of fans in Greece. About 25,000 Aris' fans followed their team to the Olympic Stadium forming a queue of many kilometers on the Thessaloniki-Athens highway from a number of buses, as well as cars. It was characteristic that the last vehicle of the procession arrived at the stadium three hours after the arrival of the first.

== Venue ==
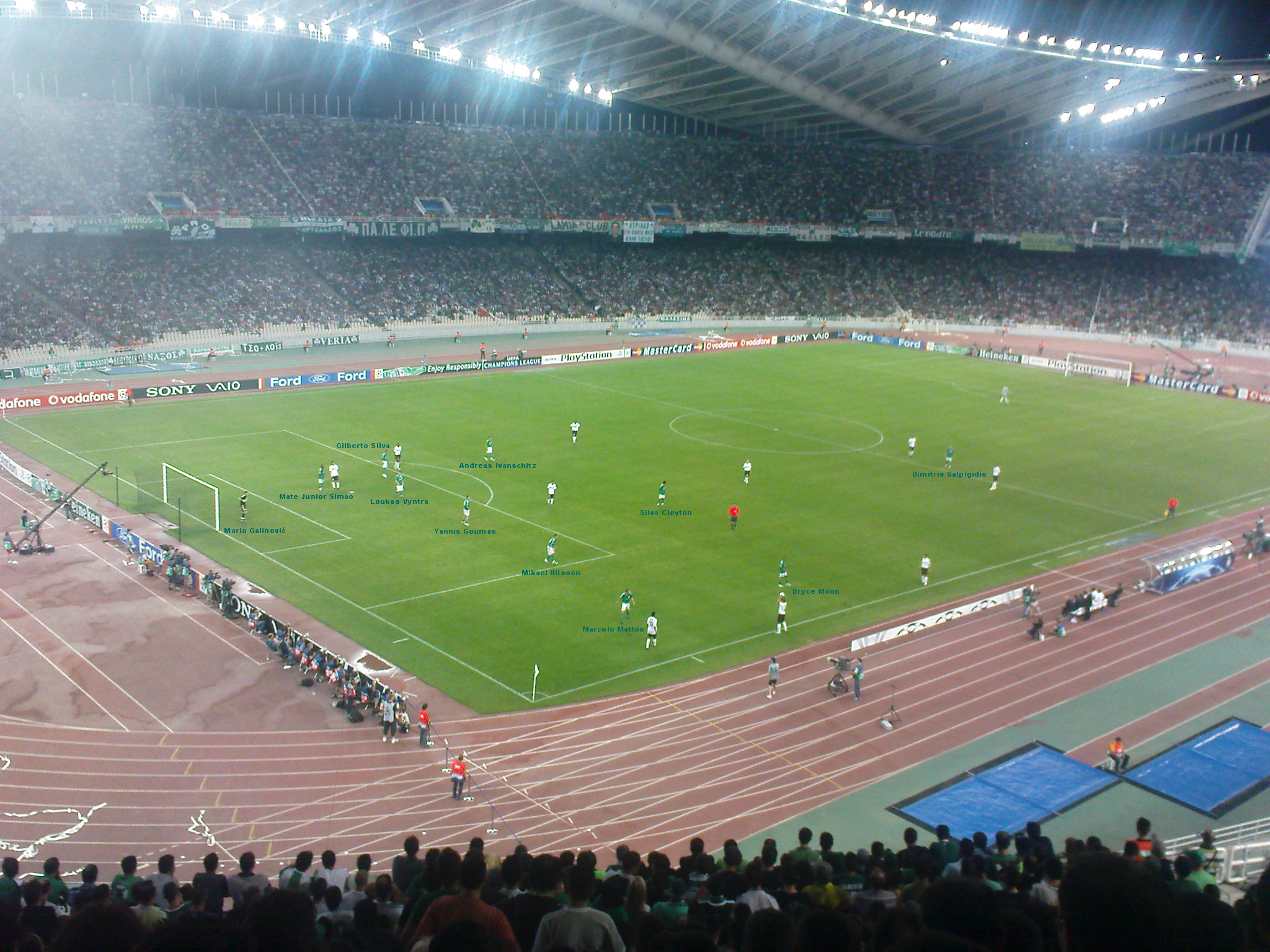
Athens Olympic Stadium.

This was the seventeenth Greek Cup final held at the Athens Olympic Stadium, after the 1983, 1984, 1985, 1986, 1987, 1988, 1989, 1990, 1993, 1994, 1995, 1996, 1999, 2000, 2002 and 2009 finals.

The Athens Olympic Stadium was built in 1982 and renovated once in 2004. The stadium is used as a venue for AEK Athens and Panathinaikos and was used for Olympiacos and Greece on various occasions. Its current capacity is 69,618 and it hosted three European Cup/UEFA Champions League finals in 1983, 1994 and 2007, a UEFA Cup Winners' Cup final in 1987, the 1991 Mediterranean Games and the 2004 Summer Olympics.

== Background ==
Panathinaikos had reached the Greek Cup final twenty seven times, winning sixteen of them. The last time that they had won the Cup was in 2004 (3–1 against Olympiacos). The last time that they had played in a final was in 2007, where they had lost to AEL by 1–2.

Aris had reached the Greek Cup final eight times, winning one of them. The last time that they had won the Cup was in 1970 (1–0 against PAOK). The last time that they had played in a final was in 2008, where they had lost to Olympiacos by 2–0.

The two teams had met each other in a Cup final one time in the 1940 final.

== Route to the final ==
Panathinaikos				Round	Aris			
Opponent	Agg.	1st leg	2nd leg		Opponent	Agg.	1st leg	2nd leg
Eordaikos 2007	3–0 (A)			Round of 32	Aspropyrgos	4–3 (A)		
Pierikos	2–1 (H)			Round of 16	Asteras Tripolis	2–0 (H)		
Kallithea	2–0 (H)			Quarter-finals	Skoda Xanthi	4–1	1–1 (A)	3–0 (H)
PAS Giannina	3–1	3–1 (H)	0–0 (A)	Semi-finals	Kavala	4–2	3–1 (H)	1–1 (A)

== Match ==
=== Details ===
24 April 2010
20:30 EEST

Panathinaikos	1–0	Aris
Leto 63'	Report

Olympic Stadium, Marousi
Attendance: 48,926
Referee: Anastasios Kakos (Corfu)

Panathinaikos	Aris

GK	30	(Greece) Alexandros Tzorvas
RB	24	(Greece) Loukas Vintra
CB	29	(Greece) Kostas Katsouranis
CB	8	(Mali) Cédric Kanté
LB	31	(Greece) Nikos Spiropoulos	(yellow card) 30'
DM	15	(Brazil) Gilberto Silva (c)
DM	23	(Mozambique) Simão Mate Junior	(yellow card) 59'
AM	7	(Greece) Sotiris Ninis		(substituted off) 66'
RW	14	(Greece) Dimitris Salpingidis		(substituted off) 62'
LW	11	(Argentina) Sebastián Leto	(yellow card) 40'	(substituted off) 78'
CF	9	(France) Djibril Cissé
Substitutes:
GK	27	(Greece) Orestis Karnezis
DF	3	(Spain) Josu Sarriegi
DF	22	(Greece) Stergos Marinos		(substituted on) 66'
DF	19	(Brazil) Gabriel
MF	26	(Greece) Giorgos Karagounis		(substituted on) 62'
FW	17	(Greece) Lazaros Christodoulopoulos		(substituted on) 78'
FW	5	(Croatia) Ante Rukavina
Manager:
(Greece) Nikos Nioplias

GK	1	(Greece) Michalis Sifakis
RB	2	(Brazil) Darcy Neto
CB	5	(Brazil) Ronaldo Guiaro
CB	15	(Argentina) Cristian Nasuti
LB	32	(Albania) Kristi Vangjeli
DM	55	(Greece) Athanasios Prittas	(yellow card) 47'
DM	6	(Tunisia) Mehdi Nafti		(substituted off) 74'
AM	17	(France) Camel Meriem		(substituted off) 66'
RW	7	(Spain) Toni Calvo	(yellow card) 12'	(substituted off) 83'
LW	10	(Spain) Sergio Koke (c)
CF	18	(Argentina) Javier Cámpora
Substitutes:
GK	28	(Slovakia) Michal Peškovič
DF	4	(Greece) Efthimios Kouloucheris
DF	25	(Spain) César Ortiz
MF	9	(Argentina) Darío Fernández		(substituted on) 74'
MF	20	(Spain) Javito		(substituted on) 66'
FW	11	(United States) Freddy Adu		(substituted on) 83'
FW	14	(United States) Eddie Johnson
Manager:
(Argentina) Héctor Cúper

Man of the Match:
(Argentina) Sebastian Leto (Panathinaikos)

Assistant referees:
Konstantinos Dallas (Epirus)
Dimitris Tatsis (Epirus)
Fourth official:
Michael Koukoulakis (Heraklion)

Match rules

- 90 minutes
- 30 minutes of extra time if necessary
- Penalty shootout if scores still level
- Seven named substitutes
- Maximum of three substitutions

== See also ==
- 2009–10 Greek Football Cup
