= 2007–08 Aris Thessaloniki F.C. season =

Aris Thessaloniki
- President: Lambros Skordas
- Manager: Juan Carlos Oliva (until 4 September 2007); Dušan Bajević (from 7 September 2007)
- Stadium: Kleanthis Vikelidis Stadium
- Super League: 4th
- Greek Cup: Finalist
- UEFA Cup: Group stage
- Top goalscorer: League: Sergio Koke (10); All: Sergio Koke (12)
Home colours	Away colours

The 2007–08 season was the 94th season in Aris Thessaloniki F.C.'s existence. The club finished 4th in the Super League's regular season and in the same place in play-offs. The club qualified in to the UEFA Cup of the next season.

Aris Thessaloniki was the finalist of Greek Football Cup where they lost by Olympiacos.

In Europe, Aris Thessaloniki was eliminated in Group stage of UEFA Cup after they finished 4th in Group F.

The club hired Juan Carlos Oliva as its manager for that season. After the first game of the league Juan Carlos Oliva quit and replaced by Dušan Bajević for the rest of the season

== First-team squad ==
#	Name	Nationality	Position(s)	Date of birth (age)	Signed from
Goalkeepers
1	Kostas Chalkias	(Greece)	GK	30 May 1974 (aged 34)	(Spain) Real Murcia
12	Marián Kelemen	(Slovakia)	GK	7 December 1979 (aged 28)	(Spain) Vecindario
31	Dimitrios Karatziovalis	(Greece)	GK	22 July 1975 (aged 32)	(Greece) Apollon Kalamarias
38	Kyriakos Stratilatis	(Greece)	GK	5 January 1988 (aged 20)	Club's Academy
Defenders
2	Darcy Dolce Neto	(Brazil)	RB / RW	7 February 1981 (aged 27)	(Brazil) Santos
3	Efthymis Kouloucheris	(Greece)	CB / DM	10 March 1981 (aged 27)	(Greece) Olympiacos
4	Avraam Papadopoulos	(Greece) / (Australia)	CB / DM	3 December 1984 (aged 23)	Club's Academy
5	Ronaldo Guiaro	(Brazil) / (Portugal)	CB	18 February 1974 (aged 34)	(Brazil) Santos
13	Theodoros Papadopoulos	(Greece)	LB	11 August 1987 (aged 20)	Club's Academy
15	Nikos Karabelas	(Greece)	LB / LM	20 December 1984 (aged 23)	(Greece) Paniliakos
22	Marco Aurélio	(Brazil) / (Portugal)	LB / LM / DM	27 March 1983 (aged 25)	(Brazil) União São João
23	Giorgos Koltsidas	(Greece)	CB / RB	23 September 1970 (aged 37)	(Greece) Trikala
26	Sanel Jahić	(Bosnia and Herzegovina) / (France)	CB / RB / DM	10 December 1981 (aged 26)	(Bosnia and Herzegovina) Željezničar
32	Kristi Vangjeli	(Albania)	CB / RB / LB	5 September 1985 (aged 22)	Club's Academy
Midfielders
6	Konstantinos Nebegleras (captain)	(Greece)	DM	14 April 1975 (aged 33)	(Greece) Iraklis
8	Nacho García (vice-captain)	(Bolivia)	CM / DM	17 December 1980 (aged 27)	(Bolivia) Oriente Petrolero
11	Diogo Siston	(Brazil)	AM	25 January 1981 (aged 27)	(Portugal) Santa Clara
18	Vladimir Ivić	(Serbia)	AM / CM	7 May 1977 (aged 31)	(Greece) AEK Athens
24	Thiago Gentil	(Brazil) / (Italy)	AM / SS / LW	8 April 1980 (aged 28)	(Brazil) Figueirense
28	Sakis Prittas	(Greece)	CM / DM	9 January 1979 (aged 29)	(Greece) Iraklis
Forwards
7	Toni Calvo	(Spain)	RW / LW	28 March 1987 (aged 21)	(Spain) Barcelona B
10	Sergio Koke	(Spain)	ST / SS	27 April 1983 (aged 25)	(France) Olympique de Marseille
14	Felipe Sanchón	(Spain)	ST / LW / RW	8 April 1982 (aged 26)	(Spain) L'Hospitalet
17	Giannis Gesios	(Greece)	ST / LW / RW	3 August 1988 (aged 19)	Club's Academy
19	Thanasis Papazoglou	(Greece)	ST	30 March 1988 (aged 20)	Club's Academy
20	Javito Peral	(Spain)	LW / RW	4 November 1983 (aged 24)	(Spain) Barcelona B
30	Márcio Amoroso	(Brazil) / (Italy)	ST / RW / AM	5 July 1974 (aged 33)	Free agent

== Transfers and loans ==
=== Transfers in ===
Entry date	Position	No.	Player	From club	Fee	Ref.
June 2007	DF	2	(Brazil) Darcy Dolce Neto	(Brazil) Santos	€200.000	
June 2007	MF	11	(Brazil) Diogo Siston	(Portugal) Santa Clara	€30.000	
June 2007	DF	22	(Brazil) Marco Aurélio	(Brazil) União São João	€30.000	
June 2007	MF	28	(Greece) Sakis Prittas	(Greece) Iraklis	Free	
June 2007	FW	7	(Spain) Toni Calvo	(Spain) Barcelona B	€150.000	
June 2007	FW	14	(Spain) Felipe Sanchón	(Spain) L'Hospitalet	Free	
June 2007	DF	5	(Brazil) / (Portugal) Ronaldo Guiaro	(Brazil) Santos	Free	
July 2007	GK	12	(Slovakia) Marián Kelemen	(Spain) Vecindario	Free	
August 2007	MF	18	(Serbia) Vladimir Ivić	(Greece) AEK Athens	Free	
January 2008	DF	26	(Bosnia and Herzegovina) / (France) Sanel Jahić	(Bosnia and Herzegovina) Željezničar	€20.000	
January 2008	MF	24	(Brazil) / (Italy) Thiago Gentil	(Brazil) Figueirense	Free	
January 2008	FW	30	(Brazil) / (Italy) Márcio Amoroso	Free agent	Free	

=== Transfers out ===
Exit date	Position	No.	Player	To club	Fee	Ref.
June 2007	MF	9	(Greece) Petros Passalis	Retired		
July 2007	FW	99	(Brazil) / (Italy) Cacá	(Paraguay) Cerro Porteño	Released	
July 2007	DF	25	(Uruguay) / (Italy) Sebastián Flores	(Spain) Cobeña	Released	
July 2007	DF	80	(Spain) Pablo Coira	(Spain) Figueres	Released	
July 2007	FW	3	(Spain) Álex Pérez	(Spain) Albacete Balompié	Released	
July 2007	FW	16	(Spain) / (Germany) José Reyes	(Greece) Atromitos	Released	
July 2007	MF	10	(Portugal) Paulo Costa	(Cyprus) Aris Limassol	Released	
July 2007	DF	2	(Brazil) Tuta	(Cyprus) APOP Kinyras Peyias	Released	
July 2007	DF	25	(Brazil) Tinga	(Cyprus) APOP Kinyras Peyias	Released	
July 2007	GK	41	(Brazil) Alexandre Negri	(Cyprus) APOP Kinyras Peyias	Released	
July 2007	MF	21	(Brazil) Rogério Belém	(Greece) Kallithea	Released	
July 2007	MF	18	(Spain) Aarón Escudero	(Spain) Alcorcón	Released	
January 2008	MF	16	(Spain) Jonan García	(Spain) Ibiza-Eivissa	Released	
January 2008	FW	29	(Greece) Georgios Gougoulias	(Greece) Panserraikos	Released	
January 2008	FW	77	(Greece) Tasos Kyriakos	(Greece) Asteras Tripolis	Released	
January 2008	DF	55	(Greece) Spyros Gogolos	(Greece) PAS Giannina	Released	

=== Loans in ===
Start date	End date	Position	No.	Player	From club	Fee	Ref.
July 2007	December 2007	FW	9	(Brazil) / (Portugal) Anderson Costa	(Croatia) Dinamo Zagreb	None	

== Competitions ==
=== Overall ===
Competition	Started round	Current position / round	Final position / round	First match	Last match
Super League	Matchday 1	—	4th	1 September 2007	14 May 2008
Regular Season	Matchday 1	—	4th	1 September 2007	20 April 2008
Play-offs	Matchday 1	—	4th	23 April 2008	14 May 2008
Greek Cup	Fourth Round	—	Final	11 October 2007	17 May 2008
UEFA Cup	First round	—	Group stage	20 September 2007	19 December 2007

Updated to match played 17 May 2008
Source: Competitions

=== Overview ===
Competition	Record							
Competition	G	W	D	L	GF	GA	GD	Win %
Super League	36	15	10	11	42	29	+13	41.67
Greek Cup	7	5	1	1	8	3	+5	71.43
UEFA Cup	6	2	2	2	7	10	−3	33.33
Total	49	22	13	14	57	42	+15	44.90

Updated to match played 17 May 2008
Source: Competitions

Super League 1	Record							
Super League 1	G	W	D	L	GF	GA	GD	Win %
Regular Season	30	14	8	8	33	20	+13	46.67
Play-offs	6	1	2	3	9	9	+0	16.67
Total	36	15	10	11	42	29	+13	41.67

Updated to match played 17 May 2008
Source: Competitions

==== Managers' overview ====
===== Juan Carlos Oliva =====
Competition	Record							
Competition	G	W	D	L	GF	GA	GD	Win %
Super League	1	0	1	0	0	0	+0	0.00
Greek Cup	0	0	0	0	0	0	+0	—
UEFA Cup	0	0	0	0	0	0	+0	—
Total	1	0	1	0	0	0	+0	0.00

Updated to match played 4 September 2007
Source: Competitions

===== Dušan Bajević =====
Competition	Record							
Competition	G	W	D	L	GF	GA	GD	Win %
Super League	35	15	9	11	42	29	+13	42.86
Greek Cup	7	5	1	1	8	3	+5	71.43
UEFA Cup	6	2	2	2	7	10	−3	33.33
Total	48	22	12	14	57	42	+15	45.83

Updated to match played 17 May 2008
Source: Competitions

=== Super League ===
==== Regular season ====
===== League table =====
Pos	Team	Pld	W	D	L	GF	GA	GD	Pts	Qualification or relegation
2	AEK Athens	30	22	2	6	65	17	+48	68	Qualification for the Play-offs
3	Panathinaikos	30	20	6	4	44	18	+26	66	Qualification for the Play-offs
4	Aris	30	14	8	8	32	20	+12	50	Qualification for the Play-offs
5	Panionios	30	13	6	11	39	42	−3	45 (Note: Head-to-head record: Panionios–AEL 3–1, AEL–Panionios 1–0.)	Qualification for the Play-offs
6	AEL	30	11	12	7	35	30	+5	45	

Source: Super League Greece
Rules for classification: 1st points; 2nd head-to-head points; 3rd head-to-head goal difference; 4th decision match.
According to the official Super League playoff regulation, the position after the playoffs replaces the regular season position.

===== Results summary =====
Overall								Home						Away					
Pld	W	D	L	GF	GA	GD	Pts	W	D	L	GF	GA	GD	W	D	L	GF	GA	GD
30	14	8	8	33	20	+13	50	8	5	2	21	9	+12	6	3	6	12	11	+1

Last updated: 20 April 2008.
Source: Super League

===== Matches =====
1 September 2007 1	Aris Thessaloniki	0 – 0	Panionios	Thessaloniki
17:00		Report		Stadium: Kleanthis Vikelidis Stadium; Referee: Vasilios Terovitsas

23 September 2007 2	Apollon Kalamarias	0 – 0	Aris Thessaloniki	Thessaloniki
17:00		Report		Stadium: Kaftanzoglio Stadium; Referee: Michalis Germanakos

29 September 2007 3	Aris Thessaloniki	1 – 1	Olympiacos	Thessaloniki
14:45	Marco Aurélio 90+3'	Report	Luciano Galletti 39'	Stadium: Kleanthis Vikelidis Stadium; Referee: Georgios Kasnaferis

7 October 2007 4	Ergotelis	0 – 1	Aris Thessaloniki	Heraklion
15:00		Report	Ronaldo Guiaro 60'	Stadium: Pankritio Stadium; Referee: Konstantinos Papastamatis

21 October 2007 5	Aris Thessaloniki	3 – 1	PAOK	Thessaloniki
17:00	Sergio Koke 16', 57'; Nacho García 73'	Report	Sotiris Balafas 30'	Stadium: Kleanthis Vikelidis Stadium; Referee: Anastasios Kakos

27 October 2007 6	Asteras Tripolis	0 – 0	Aris Thessaloniki	Tripoli
17:00		Report		Stadium: Theodoros Kolokotronis Stadium; Referee: Ioannis Stavridis

4 November 2007 7	Aris Thessaloniki	1 – 0	Veria	Thessaloniki
17:00	Ronaldo Guiaro 32'	Report		Stadium: Kleanthis Vikelidis Stadium; Referee: Stavros Tritsonis

11 November 2007 8	Atromitos	1 – 2	Aris Thessaloniki	Athens
14:45	Luciano 38'	Report	Nacho García 9'; Diogo Siston 71'	Stadium: Peristeri Stadium; Referee: Nathanail Charalabidis

24 November 2007 9	Levadiakos	2 – 0	Aris Thessaloniki	Livadeia
14:45	Eduardo Montoya 29', 43'	Report		Stadium: Levadia Municipal Stadium; Referee: Vasileios Paboridis

2 December 2007 10	Aris Thessaloniki	0 – 1	AEK Athens	Thessaloniki
17:00		Report	Traianos Dellas 82'	Stadium: Kleanthis Vikelidis Stadium; Referee: Michail Koukoulakis

9 December 2007 11	AEL	1 – 0	Aris Thessaloniki	Larissa
14:45	Facundo Parra 90'	Report		Stadium: Alcazar Stadium; Referee: Konstantinos Papastamatis

15 December 2007 12	Aris Thessaloniki	2 – 0	Skoda Xanthi	Thessaloniki
17:00	Nacho García 64'; Felipe Sanchón 87'	Report		Stadium: Kleanthis Vikelidis Stadium; Referee: Michalis Germanakos

23 December 2007 13	Iraklis	0 – 2	Aris Thessaloniki	Thessaloniki
17:00		Report	Felipe Sanchón 32'; Javito Peral 90+4'	Stadium: Kaftanzoglio Stadium; Referee: Ioannis Stavridis

30 December 2007 14	Aris Thessaloniki	0 – 1	Panathinaikos	Thessaloniki
17:00		Report	Avraam Papadopoulos 44' (o.g.)	Stadium: Kleanthis Vikelidis Stadium; Referee: Anastasios Kakos

6 January 2008 15	OFI	0 – 1	Aris Thessaloniki	Heraklion
14:45		Report	Vladimir Ivić 72'	Stadium: Theodoros Vardinogiannis Stadium; Referee: Romanos Kontogiannidis

12 January 2008 16	Panionios	0 – 3	Aris Thessaloniki	Athens
14:45		Report	Toni Calvo 4' (pen.); Sergio Koke 68', 70'	Stadium: Nea Smyrni Stadium; Referee: Georgios Daloukas

19 January 2008 17	Aris Thessaloniki	2 – 2	Apollon Kalamarias	Thessaloniki
17:00	Vladimir Ivić 25', 45'	Report	Eduardo Brito 62'; Alban Bushi 90+3'	Stadium: Kleanthis Vikelidis Stadium; Referee: Theofilos Fotiadis

27 January 2008 18	Olympiacos	1 – 0	Aris Thessaloniki	Piraeus
17:00	Predrag Đorđević 80' (pen.)	Report		Stadium: Karaiskakis Stadium; Referee: Ilias Mazarakos

3 February 2008 19	Aris Thessaloniki	2 – 0	Ergotelis	Thessaloniki
14:45	Avraam Papadopoulos 22' (pen.); Felipe Sanchón 49'	Report		Stadium: Kleanthis Vikelidis Stadium; Referee: Ilias Spathas

10 February 2008 20	PAOK	3 – 0	Aris Thessaloniki	Thessaloniki
14:45	Sotiris Balafas 32'; Lazaros Christodoulopoulos 37'; Glen Salmon 45'	Report		Stadium: Toumba Stadium; Referee: Ioannis Stavridis

17 February 2008 21	Aris Thessaloniki	2 – 0	Asteras Tripolis	Thessaloniki
17:45	Sergio Koke 14'; Marco Aurélio 54'	Report		Stadium: Kleanthis Vikelidis Stadium; Referee: Anastasios Kakos

23 February 2008 22	Veria	1 – 0	Aris Thessaloniki	Veria
14:45	Maciej Bykowski 27'	Report		Stadium: Veria Stadium; Referee: Dimitrios Kyrkos

2 March 2008 23	Aris Thessaloniki	2 – 0	Atromitos	Thessaloniki
17:00	Sergio Koke 31'; Márcio Amoroso 70'	Report		Stadium: Kleanthis Vikelidis Stadium; Referee: Michail Dakos

8 March 2008 24	Aris Thessaloniki	1 – 0	Levadiakos	Thessaloniki
17:00	Vladimir Ivić 50'	Report		Stadium: Kleanthis Vikelidis Stadium; Referee: Michalis Germanakos

16 March 2008 25	AEK Athens	1 – 1	Aris Thessaloniki	Athens
17:00	Edinho 45'	Report	Thiago Gentil 88'	Stadium: Olympic Stadium; Referee: Georgios Kasnaferis

23 March 2008 26	Aris Thessaloniki	1 – 1	AEL	Thessaloniki
17:00	Toni Calvo 56'	Report	Facundo Parra 84'	Stadium: Kleanthis Vikelidis Stadium; Referee: Evangelos Katsidonis

30 March 2008 27	Skoda Xanthi	0 – 2	Aris Thessaloniki	Xanthi
17:00		Report	Diogo Siston 76'; Nacho García 88'	Stadium: Xanthi FC Arena; Referee: Marios Labropoulos

6 April 2008 28	Aris Thessaloniki	2 – 2	Iraklis	Thessaloniki
17:00	Toni Calvo 32' (pen.); Sergio Koke 76'	Report	Dimitris Giantsis 64'; Aggelos Komvolidis 86'	Stadium: Kleanthis Vikelidis Stadium; Referee: Dimitrios Kalopoulos

13 April 2008 29	Panathinaikos	1 – 0	Aris Thessaloniki	Athens
17:00	Giorgos Karagounis 74'	Report		Stadium: Leoforos Alexandras Stadium; Referee: Vasileios Paboridis

20 April 2008 30	Aris Thessaloniki	2 – 0	OFI	Thessaloniki
17:00	Javito Peral 59'; Sergio Koke 70'	Report		Stadium: Kleanthis Vikelidis Stadium; Referee: Leontios Tratos

==== Play-offs ====
===== League table =====
Pos	Team	Pld	W	D	L	GF	GA	GD	Pts	Qualification	PAO	AEK	ARIS	PGSS
2	Panathinaikos	6	4	2	0	14	5	+9	21	Qualification for the Champions League second qualifying round		4–1	3–1	3–0
3	AEK Athens	6	2	2	2	10	11	−1	16	Qualification for the UEFA Cup second qualifying round	1–1		1–0	5–0
4	Aris (Note: Aris were guaranteed at least to play in the 2008–09 UEFA Cup second qualifying round through their Greek Cup performance.)	6	1	2	3	9	9	0	7	Qualification for the UEFA Cup second qualifying round	1–1	4–0		3–3
5	Panionios	6	1	2	3	7	15	−8	5	Qualification for the Intertoto Cup second round	1–2	2–2	1–0	

Source: Super League Greece
Rules for classification: 1) points; 2) head-to-head points; 3) head-to-head goal difference; 4) head-to-head goals scored; 5) goal difference; 6) number of goals scored.
Notes:

The teams started the play-offs with the following number of points:

- AEK Athens – 8
- Panathinaikos – 7
- Aris Thessaloniki – 2
- Panionios – 0

===== Results summary =====
Overall								Home						Away					
Pld	W	D	L	GF	GA	GD	Pts	W	D	L	GF	GA	GD	W	D	L	GF	GA	GD
6	1	2	3	9	9	0	5	1	2	0	8	4	+4	0	0	3	1	5	−4

Last updated: 14 May 2008.
Source: Super League

===== Matches =====
23 April 2008 1	Aris Thessaloniki	1 – 1	Panathinaikos	Thessaloniki
17:00	Sergio Koke 74'	Report	Dimitrios Papadopoulos 87' (pen.)	Stadium: Kleanthis Vikelidis Stadium; Referee: Dimitrios Kyrkos

30 April 2008 2	Panionios	1 – 0	Aris Thessaloniki	Athens
14:45	Bennard Kumordzi 80'	Report		Stadium: Nea Smyrni Stadium; Referee: Georgios Daloukas

4 May 2008 3	AEK Athens	1 – 0	Aris Thessaloniki	Athens
17:00	Nikos Liberopoulos 54'	Report		Stadium: Olympic Stadium; Referee: Georgios Kasnaferis

7 May 2008 4	Aris Thessaloniki	4 – 0	AEK Athens	Thessaloniki
17:00	Konstantinos Nebegleras 6'; Javito Peral 39', 48'; Sergio Koke 55'	Report		Stadium: Kleanthis Vikelidis Stadium; Referee: Michail Koukoulakis

11 May 2008 5	Panathinaikos	3 – 1	Aris Thessaloniki	Athens
17:00	Giorgos Karagounis 56', 63'; Dame N'Doye 62'	Report	Thiago Gentil 73'	Stadium: Leoforos Alexandras Stadium; Referee: Anastasios Kakos

14 May 2008 6	Aris Thessaloniki	3 – 3	Panionios	Thessaloniki
17:00	Toni Calvo 6'; Vladimir Ivić 48'; Márcio Amoroso 75' (pen.)	Report	Dimitris Sialmas 8', 82'; Kostas Kapetanos 38'	Stadium: Kleanthis Vikelidis Stadium; Referee: Michail Dakos

=== Greek Football Cup ===
==== Fourth Round ====
11 October 2007 Fourth Round	Agios Dimitrios	0 – 1 (a.e.t.)	Aris Thessaloniki	Athens
14:45		Report	Tasos Kyriakos 119'	Stadium: Agios Dimitrios Municipal Stadium; Referee: Ilias Spathas

==== Fifth Round ====
9 January 2008 Fifth Round	Ethnikos Katerini	0 – 3	Aris Thessaloniki	Katerini
16:45		Report	Javito 27'; Vladimir Ivić 52', 77'	Stadium: "Giannis Kalianidis" Stadium; Referee: Georgios Daloukas

==== Quarter-finals ====
27 February 2008 First leg	Skoda Xanthi	0 – 0	Aris Thessaloniki	Xanthi
16:45		Report		Stadium: Xanthi FC Arena; Referee: Michalis Koukoulakis

20 March 2008 Second leg	Aris Thessaloniki	1 – 0 (1–0 agg.)	Skoda Xanthi	Thessaloniki
16:45	Sanel Jahić 71'	Report		Stadium: Kleanthis Vikelidis Stadium; Referee: Georgios Daloukas

==== Semi-finals ====
2 April 2008 First leg	Aris Thessaloniki	1 – 0	Atromitos	Thessaloniki
18:00	Toni Calvo 90+7' (pen.)	Report		Stadium: Kleanthis Vikelidis Stadium; Referee: Michalis Koukoulakis

16 February 2020 Second leg	Atromitos	1 – 2 (1–3 agg.)	Aris Thessaloniki	Athens
17:45	Nikos Nikolopoulos 90+3'	Report	Sergio Koke 76'; Vladimir Ivić 81'	Stadium: Peristeri Stadium; Referee: Lazaros Polatian

==== Final ====
17 May 2008 Final	Olympiacos	2 – 0	Aris Thessaloniki	Thessaloniki
18:00	Darko Kovačević 33'; Michał Żewłakow 53'	Report		Stadium: Kaftanzoglio Stadium; Referee: Georgios Kasnaferis

=== UEFA Cup ===
==== First round ====
20 September 2007 First leg	Aris Thessaloniki (Greece)	1 – 0	(Spain) Real Zaragoza	Thessaloniki
21:30	Avraam Papadopoulos 6'	Report		Stadium: Kleanthis Vikelidis Stadium; Referee: Viktor Kassai (Hungary)

4 October 2007 Second leg	Real Zaragoza (Spain)	2 – 1 (2–2 (a) agg.)	(Greece) Aris Thessaloniki	Zaragoza
22:00	Ricardo Oliveira 19'; Sergio García 72'	Report	Javito Peral 63'	Stadium: La Romareda; Referee: Stuart Dougal (Scotland)

==== Group stage ====
===== Group table =====
Team	Pld	W	D	L	GF	GA	GD	Pts
(Germany) Bayern Munich	4	2	2	0	12	5	+7	8
(Portugal) Braga	4	1	3	0	5	3	+2	6
(England) Bolton Wanderers	4	1	3	0	5	4	+1	6
(Greece) Aris Thessaloniki	4	1	2	1	5	8	−3	5
(Serbia) Red Star Belgrade	4	0	0	4	2	9	−7	0

Source: uefa.com

===== Matches =====
25 October 2007 1	No Game

8 November 2007 2	Aris Thessaloniki (Greece)	3 – 0	(Serbia) Red Star Belgrade	Thessaloniki
21:45	Thanasis Papazoglou 76', 89'; Sergio Koke 90+1'	Report		Stadium: Kleanthis Vikelidis Stadium; Referee: Nikolai Ivanov (Russia)

29 November 2007 3	Bolton Wanderers (England)	1 – 1	(Greece) Aris Thessaloniki	Horwich
22:00	Stelios Giannakopoulos 90+2'	Report	Toni Calvo 44'	Stadium: Reebok Stadium; Referee: Eduardo Iturralde González (Spain)

6 December 2007 4	Aris Thessaloniki (Greece)	1 – 1	(Portugal) Braga	Thessaloniki
21:45	Ronaldo Guiaro 26'	Report	Roland Linz 6'	Stadium: Kleanthis Vikelidis Stadium; Referee: Robert Małek (Poland)

19 December 2007 5	Bayern Munich (Germany)	6 – 0	(Greece) Aris Thessaloniki	Munich
21:45	Luca Toni 25', 38', 64', 66'; Christian Lell 78'; Philipp Lahm 81'	Report		Stadium: Allianz Arena; Referee: Alon Yefet (Israel)

== Squad statistics ==
=== Appearances ===
Players with no appearances not included in the list.

As of match played 17 May 2008

#	Position	Nat.	Player	Super League (Note: included matches for Play-Offs)	Greek Cup	UEFA Cup	Total
1	GK	(Greece)	Kostas Chalkias	25	2	6	33
2	DF	(Brazil)	Darcy Dolce Neto	27	6	5	38
3	DF	(Greece)	Efthymis Kouloucheris	11	1	2	14
4	DF	(Greece) / (Australia)	Avraam Papadopoulos	30	7	6	43
5	DF	(Brazil) / (Portugal)	Ronaldo Guiaro	29	5	6	40
6	MF	(Greece)	Konstantinos Nebegleras	30	7	6	43
7	FW	(Spain)	Toni Calvo	25	6	5	36
8	MF	(Bolivia)	Nacho García	25	3	6	34
10	FW	(Spain)	Sergio Koke	32	6	6	44
11	MF	(Brazil)	Diogo Siston	26	6	6	38
12	GK	(Slovakia)	Marián Kelemen	11	5	0	16
14	FW	(Spain)	Felipe Sanchón	29	7	4	40
15	DF	(Greece)	Nikos Karabelas	12	2	2	16
18	MF	(Serbia)	Vladimir Ivić	29	6	5	40
19	FW	(Greece)	Thanasis Papazoglou	10	1	1	12
20	FW	(Spain)	Javito Peral	29	3	6	38
22	DF	(Brazil) / (Portugal)	Marco Aurélio	26	4	4	34
23	DF	(Greece)	Giorgos Koltsidas	2	1	0	3
24	MF	(Brazil) / (Italy)	Thiago Gentil	16	4	0	20
26	DF	(Bosnia and Herzegovina) / (France)	Sanel Jahić	20	6	0	26
28	MF	(Greece)	Sakis Prittas	21	5	2	28
30	FW	(Brazil) / (Italy)	Márcio Amoroso	12	0	0	12
32	DF	(Albania)	Kristi Vangjeli	17	2	3	22
Players who left the club during this season
	FW	(Brazil) / (Portugal)	Anderson Costa	3	0	0	3
	MF	(Spain)	Jonan García	1	0	0	1
	FW	(Greece)	Georgios Gougoulias	2	2	1	5
	FW	(Greece)	Tasos Kyriakos	3	1	1	5
Total				36	7	6	49

=== Goals ===
As of match played 17 May 2008

Ranking	Position	Nat.	Player	Super League (Note: included goals for Play-Offs)	Greek Cup	UEFA Cup	Total
1	FW	(Spain)	Sergio Koke	10	1	1	12
2	MF	(Serbia)	Vladimir Ivić	5	3	0	8
3	FW	(Spain)	Toni Calvo	4	1	1	6
3	FW	(Spain)	Javito Peral	4	1	1	6
5	MF	(Bolivia)	Nacho García	4	0	0	4
6	FW	(Spain)	Felipe Sanchón	3	0	0	3
6	DF	(Brazil) / (Portugal)	Ronaldo Guiaro	2	0	1	3
8	DF	(Brazil)	Marco Aurélio	2	0	0	2
8	MF	(Brazil)	Diogo Siston	2	0	0	2
8	FW	(Brazil) / (Italy)	Thiago Gentil	2	0	0	2
8	FW	(Brazil) / (Italy)	Márcio Amoroso	2	0	0	2
8	DF	(Greece) / (Australia)	Avraam Papadopoulos	1	0	1	2
8	FW	(Greece)	Thanasis Papazoglou	0	0	2	2
14	MF	(Greece)	Konstantinos Nebegleras	1	0	0	1
14	DF	(Bosnia and Herzegovina) / (France)	Sanel Jahić	0	1	0	1
14	FW	(Greece)	Tasos Kyriakos	0	1	0	1
Own Goals				0	0	0	0
Total				42	8	7	57

=== Clean sheets ===
As of match played 17 May 2008

#	Nat.	Player	Super League (Note: included clean sheets for Play-Offs)	Greek Cup	UEFA Cup	Total
1	(Greece)	Kostas Chalkias	13	2	2	17
12	(Slovakia)	Marián Kelemen	3	3	0	6
Total			16	5	2	23
