= 2008 Greek Football Cup final =

2008 Greek Cup final
- Event: 2007–08 Greek Football Cup
Olympiacos	Aris
2	0
- Date: 17 May 2008
- Venue: Kaftanzoglio Stadium, Thessaloniki
- Man of the Match: Luciano Galletti (Olympiacos)
- Referee: Giorgos Kasnaferis (Athens)
- Attendance: 19,199
- Weather: Partly Cloudy; 22 °C (72 °F); 46% humidity

The 2008 Greek Cup final was the 64th final of the Greek Cup. The match took place on 17 May 2008 at Kaftanzoglio Stadium. The contesting teams were Olympiacos and Aris. It was Olympiacos' thirty-third Greek Cup final in their 83 years of existence and Aris' eighth Greek Cup final in their 94-year history. It was the final match for referee Giorgos Kasnaferis, who officiated four of the last eight cup finals.

== Venue ==
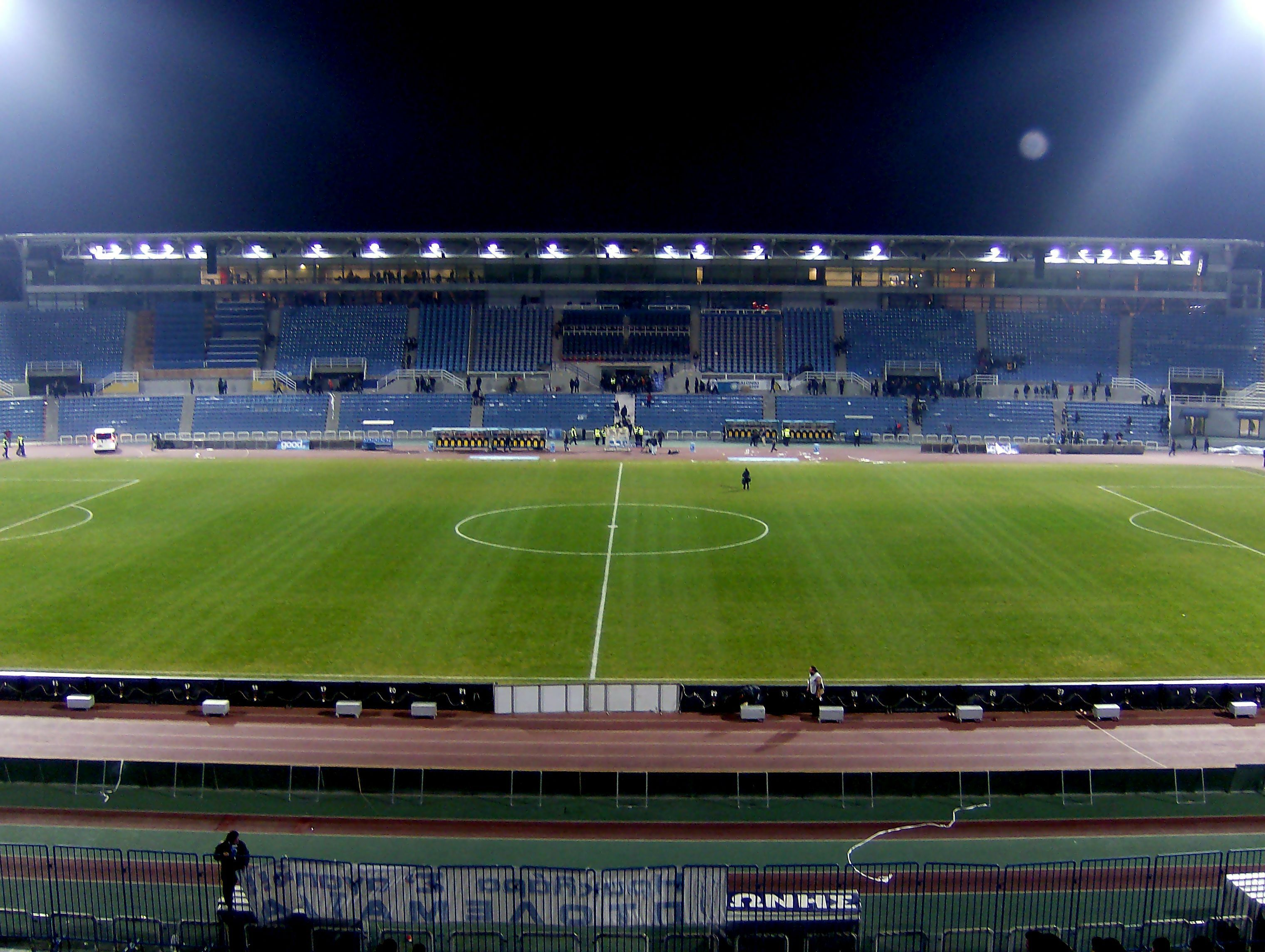
Kaftanzoglio Stadium.

This was the second Greek Cup final held at Kaftanzoglio Stadium, after the 1970 final.

Kaftanzoglio Stadium was built in 1960 and renovated once in 2004. The stadium is used as a venue for Iraklis and was used for Greece in 1969. Its current capacity is 27,770 and hosted a UEFA Cup Winners' Cup final in 1973.

== Background ==
Olympiacos had reached the Greek Cup final thirty=two times, winning twenty-two of them. The last time that they had played in a final was in 2006, where they had won against AEK Athens by 3–0.

Aris had reached the Greek Cup final seven times, winning one of them. The last time that they had won the Cup was in 1970 (1–0 against PAOK). The last time that they had played in a final was in 2005, where they had lost to Olympiacos by 3–0.

The two teams had met each other in a Cup final one time in the 2005 final.

== Route to the final ==
Olympiacos				Round	Aris			
Opponent	Agg.	1st leg	2nd leg		Opponent	Agg.	1st leg	2nd leg
Diagoras	2–1 (A)			Round of 32	Agios Dimitrios	1–0 (a.e.t.) (A)		
Panathinaikos	4–0 (H)			Round of 16	Ethnikos Katerini	3–0 (A)		
Iraklis	4–2	2–0 (H)	2–2 (A)	Quarter-finals	Skoda Xanthi	1–0	0–0 (A)	1–0 (H)
Thrasyvoulos	6–3	3–2 (A)	3–1 (H)	Semi-finals	Atromitos	3–1	1–0 (H)	2–1 (A)

== Match ==
=== Details ===
17 May 2008
19:00 EEST

Olympiacos	2–0	Aris
Kovačević 33'; Żewłakow 53'	Report

Kaftanzoglio Stadium, Thessaloniki
Attendance: 19,199
Referee: Giorgos Kasnaferis (Athens)

Olympiacos	Aris

GK	71	(Greece) Antonis Nikopolidis
RB	35	(Greece) Vasilis Torosidis
CB	18	(Greece) Paraskevas Antzas
CB	14	(Poland) Michał Żewłakow
LB	15	(Spain) Raúl Bravo	(yellow card) 21'
DM	6	(Greece) Ieroklis Stoltidis
DM	2	(Greece) Christos Patsatzoglou
RM	7	(Argentina) Luciano Galletti		(substituted off) 85'
LM	11	(Serbia) Predrag Đorđević (c)	(yellow card) 87'
CF	9	(Serbia) Darko Kovačević	(yellow card) 84'	(substituted off) 90+1'
CF	22	(Greece) Kostas Mitroglou		(substituted off) 82'
Substitutes:
GK	87	(Greece) Michalis Sifakis
DF	30	(Greece) Anastasios Pantos		(substituted on) 82'
DF	92	(Greece) Kyriakos Papadopoulos
MF	25	(Argentina) Fernando Belluschi
MF	28	(Argentina) Cristian Ledesma
MF	77	(Slovenia) Mirnes Šišić		(substituted on) 85'
FW	23	(Cyprus) Michalis Konstantinou		(substituted on) 90+1'
Manager:
(Spain) José Segura

GK	12	(Slovakia) Marian Kelemen
RB	2	(Brazil) Darcy Neto
CB	5	(Brazil) Ronaldo Guiaro	(substituted off) 80'
CB	4	(Greece) Avraam Papadopoulos
LB	15	(Greece) Nikolaos Karabellas	(substituted off) 61'
DM	26	(Bosnia and Herzegovina) Sanel Jahić
DM	6	(Greece) Konstantinos Nebegleras (c)
RM	20	(Spain) Javito	(substituted off) 63'
LM	11	(Brazil) Diogo Siston
AM	18	(Serbia) Vladimir Ivić
CF	10	(Spain) Sergio Koke
Substitutes:
GK	1	(Greece) Kostas Chalkias
DF	22	(Brazil) Marco Aurélio
MF	7	(Spain) Toni Calvo	(substituted on) 63'
MF	24	(Brazil) Thiago Gentil	(substituted on) 80'
MF	28	(Greece) Athanasios Prittas
FW	14	(Spain) Felipe Sanchón	(substituted on) 61'
FW	19	(Greece) Thanasis Papazoglou
Manager:
(Bosnia and Herzegovina) Dušan Bajević

Man of the Match:
(Argentina) Luciano Galletti (Olympiacos)

Assistant referees:
Dimitris Saraidaris (Thessaloniki)
Chtistos Kalaitzidis (Athens)

Match rules

- 90 minutes
- 30 minutes of extra time if necessary
- Penalty shootout if scores still level
- Seven named substitutes
- Maximum of three substitutions

== See also ==
- 2007–08 Greek Football Cup
