= Mehdi Nafti =

Tunisian footballer and manager (born 1978)

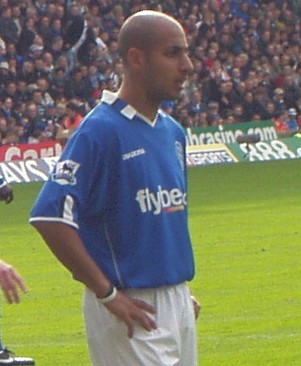
- Nafti playing for Birmingham City in 2005

Personal information
- Date of birth: 28 November 1978 (age 47)
- Place of birth: Toulouse, France
- Height: 1.78 m (5 ft 10 in)
- Positions: Defensive midfielder; central defender

Team information
- Current team: Ponferradina (manager)

Youth career
- 1995–1997: Toulouse

Senior career*
| Years | Team | Apps | (Gls) |
| 1997–2000 | Toulouse | 28 | (1) |
| 2000–2001 | Racing B | 21 | (0) |
| 2000–2005 | Racing Santander | 110 | (3) |
| 2005 | → Birmingham City (loan) | 10 | (0) |
| 2005–2009 | Birmingham City | 70 | (0) |
| 2009–2011 | Aris | 32 | (4) |
| 2011–2012 | Valladolid | 51 | (1) |
| 2012–2013 | Murcia | 30 | (0) |
| 2013–2014 | Cádiz | 15 | (0) |
| Total | | 364 | (9) |

International career
| 2002–2010 | Tunisia | 46 | (1) |

Managerial career
- 2016–2017: Marbella
- 2017: Mérida
- 2018: Mérida
- 2018–2020: Badajoz
- 2020–2021: Lugo
- 2021–2022: Leganés
- 2022: Levante
- 2023: Wydad
- 2023–2024: Alcorcón
- 2024–2025: Al-Khor
- 2025–: Ponferradina
Medal record
Men's football
Representing Tunisia
Africa Cup of Nations
| Winner | 2004 |
- * Club domestic league appearances and goals

Mehdi Nafti (Arabic: مَهْدِيّ النَّفْطِيّ; born 28 November 1978) is a Tunisian football manager and former player, who is currently in charge of SD Ponferradina.

Nafti played as a defensive midfielder for Toulouse, Racing Santander, Birmingham City, Aris, Valladolid, Murcia and Cádiz. He was born in France, and won 46 caps for Tunisia, representing the nation at the 2006 World Cup and three Africa Cup of Nations tournaments.

After retiring as a player he went into coaching, working mainly in Spain. He managed Lugo, Leganés and Levante in the Segunda División.

== Club career ==
Born in Toulouse, France, Nafti made his professional debut with his hometown club, Toulouse FC. He was used sparingly during a three-year spell, and also played several games with the reserves. His best season was 1999–2000, as he appeared in 13 games and scored once to help the team return to Ligue 1 after one year of absence.

In summer 2000, Nafti joined Racing de Santander in La Liga and, as in his previous club, started his stint appearing for the B-team. In the 2000–01 season he played in just three games for the main squad, which was eventually relegated, then proceeded to become a very important midfield element for the Cantabrians in the following three years, whilst collecting 41 yellow cards and three red.

Nafti was signed on loan by Birmingham City in the final minutes of the January 2005 transfer window, making his Premier League debut on 5 February in a 2–0 loss away to Manchester United in which he started and was booked. Sometimes referred to as "Nasty" due to his fiery nature and tendency for cautions, he was primarily signed to replace the outgoing Robbie Savage, and finished the season strongly, which led to a permanent deal being agreed in the summer.

Nafti's 2005–06 campaign came to end before it had even begun, with a severe injury to his cruciate ligaments in a friendly with Deportivo La Coruña in early August 2005. He recovered sooner than expected, and was able to start the last match of the season, a 1–0 loss at Bolton Wanderers, with relegation already confirmed.

After having appeared in 32 games in 2006–07 to help Birmingham return to the top division, Nafti scored his first goal for them on 13 August 2008, in a 4–0 win against Wycombe Wanderers in the 2008–09 League Cup. In June 2009, after the club chose not to renew his contract, he signed a two-year deal with Aris Thessaloniki in Greece.

On 12 September 2009, Nafti scored the only goal of the home match against PAS Giannina to put Aris top of the Super League Greece after three matches. He finished his debut season with four goals from 22 league games, as Aris finished fifth.

During the January 2011 transfer window, the 32-year-old Nafti left Aris and returned to Spain, signing an 18-month contract with Segunda División club Real Valladolid. He spent the 2012–13 season with Real Murcia, helping them avoid relegation from the second tier, and had considered retiring from the game before dropping down a division to sign for Cádiz. He established himself in the latter team but was also troubled by injury, and after they signed midfielder Jon Ander Garrido in the January 2014 transfer window, Nafti's contract was cancelled.

== International career ==
A Tunisia international since 2002, Nafti represented the nation in three Africa Cup of Nations tournaments, helping it win the 2004 edition played on home soil. He then appeared in the 2005 FIFA Confederations Cup, playing against Australia (2–0 win) and Germany (3–0 loss).

Nafti was selected for the squad that competed in the 2006 FIFA World Cup in Germany, appearing in all three matches as Tunisia exited in the group stage. The previous 4 June, he scored his only international goal to equalise in a 3–1 qualifying win away to Botswana.

== Coaching career ==
On 10 June 2016, Nafti was given his first managerial job, at Segunda División B club Marbella FC, despite reportedly not possessing the licence required to manage at that level. After a series of poor results, he was fired on 7 March 2017.

Nafti was hired by another Segunda B club, Mérida AD, on 27 June 2017; he lasted until 20 December. The following 12 March, after the resignation of his successor, Loren, he returned to the Estadio Romano as manager, but left at the end of the season after failing to prevent their relegation.

In October 2018, Nafti took over as manager of CD Badajoz, also of the third division, until the end of the season. In the 2019–20 season, his team eliminated UD Las Palmas (second tier) and SD Eibar (top flight) from the Copa del Rey before an extra-time loss to Granada CF in the last 16. He was dismissed on 4 February 2020 with the team fourth in the league.

On 9 October 2020, Nafti was announced as manager of Étoile Sportive du Sahel in his home nation, but returned to Spain five days later, after being appointed in charge of second division side CD Lugo. He was sacked from the latter club the following 28 February, after a 1–4 loss to UD Almería.

Nafti replaced sacked Asier Garitano at the helm of CD Leganés, also in the Spanish second division, on 31 October 2021. He left the following 5 June, as his contract would not be renewed.

A week after leaving Leganés, Nafti signed a one-year contract with newly relegated Levante UD. He was sacked on 10 October 2022, having won twice and taken ten points from nine games.

On 2 January 2023, Nafti was hired to replace Hussein Ammouta as manager of African champions Wydad AC of Morocco. His debut three days later in the Botola was a 2–1 loss at SCC Mohammédia. The following month he led the club at the 2022 FIFA Club World Cup on home soil, being eliminated in their first match by Al Hilal SFC on penalties. On 26 February, he was replaced by Juan Carlos Garrido.

On 5 December 2023, Nafti returned to Spain and replaced Fran Fernández at the helm of AD Alcorcón, also in the second division. The following 3 June, after suffering relegation, he left the club.

Nafti took over Qatar Stars League side Al-Khor SC on 16 October 2024, but left by mutual consent the following 19 March. On 26 November 2025, he returned to Spain after being named at the helm of SD Ponferradina. The following 30 June, Nafti signed a new one-year contract ahead of the upcoming campaign.

== Career statistics ==
=== Club ===
Appearances and goals by club, season and competition
| Club | Season | League | | | National cup | | League cup | | Other | | Total | |
| Club | Season | Division | Apps | Goals | Apps | Goals | Apps | Goals | Apps | Goals | Apps | Goals |
|---|---|---|---|---|---|---|---|---|---|---|---|---|
| Toulouse | 1998–99 | Ligue 1 | 11 | 0 | 0 | 0 | 0 | 0 | — | | 11 | 0 |
| Toulouse | 1999–2000 | Ligue 2 | 13 | 1 | 2 | 0 | 1 | 0 | — | | 16 | 1 |
| Toulouse | 2000–01 | Ligue 1 | 1 | 0 | 0 | 0 | 0 | 0 | — | | 11 | 0 |
| Toulouse | Total | | 25 | 1 | 2 | 0 | 1 | 0 | — | | 28 | 1 |
| Racing B | 2000–01 | Segunda División B | 21 | 0 | — | | — | | — | | 21 | 0 |
| Racing Santander | 2000–01 | La Liga | 3 | 0 | 1 | 0 | — | | — | | 4 | 0 |
| Racing Santander | 2001–02 | Segunda División | 30 | 0 | 0 | 0 | — | | — | | 30 | 0 |
| Racing Santander | 2002–03 | La Liga | 31 | 2 | 1 | 0 | — | | — | | 32 | 2 |
| Racing Santander | 2003–04 | La Liga | 30 | 1 | 1 | 0 | — | | 0 | 0 | 31 | 1 |
| Racing Santander | 2004–05 | La Liga | 16 | 0 | 2 | 1 | — | | — | | 18 | 1 |
| Racing Santander | Total | | 110 | 3 | 4 | 1 | — | | 0 | 0 | 114 | 4 |
| Birmingham City (loan) | 2004–05 | Premier League | 10 | 0 | — | | — | | — | | 10 | 0 |
| Birmingham City | 2005–06 | Premier League | 1 | 0 | 0 | 0 | 0 | 0 | — | | 1 | 0 |
| Birmingham City | 2006–07 | Championship | 32 | 0 | 1 | 0 | 1 | 0 | — | | 34 | 0 |
| Birmingham City | 2007–08 | Premier League | 26 | 0 | 0 | 0 | 1 | 0 | — | | 27 | 0 |
| Birmingham City | 2008–09 | Championship | 11 | 0 | 0 | 0 | 1 | 1 | — | | 12 | 1 |
| Birmingham City | Total | | 70 | 0 | 1 | 0 | 3 | 1 | — | | 74 | 1 |
| Aris | 2009–10 | Super League Greece | 22 | 4 | 6 | 0 | — | | 2 (Note: Appearance(s) in Super League Greece League play-offs) | 0 | 30 | 4 |
| Aris | 2010–11 | Super League Greece | 10 | 0 | 1 | 0 | — | | 4 (Note: Appearance(s) in UEFA Europa League) | 0 | 15 | 0 |
| Aris | Total | | 32 | 4 | 7 | 0 | — | | 6 | 0 | 45 | 4 |
| Real Valladolid | 2010–11 | Segunda División | 18 | 1 | — | | — | | 2 (Note: Appearances in Segunda División play-offs) | 0 | 20 | 1 |
| Real Valladolid | 2011–12 | Segunda División | 33 | 0 | 1 | 0 | — | | 4 | 0 | 38 | 0 |
| Real Valladolid | Total | | 51 | 1 | 1 | 0 | — | | 6 | 0 | 58 | 1 |
| Real Murcia | 2012–13 | Segunda División | 30 | 0 | 0 | 0 | — | | — | | 30 | 0 |
| Cádiz | 2013–14 | Segunda División B | 15 | 0 | — | | — | | 0 | 0 | 15 | 0 |
| Career total | | | 364 | 9 | 15 | 1 | 4 | 1 | 12 | 0 | 495 | 11 |

=== International ===
Appearances and goals by national team and year
| National team | Year | Apps | Goals |
|---|---|---|---|
| Tunisia | 2002 | 4 | 0 |
| Tunisia | 2003 | 7 | 0 |
| Tunisia | 2004 | 12 | 0 |
| Tunisia | 2005 | 5 | 1 |
| Tunisia | 2006 | 6 | 0 |
| Tunisia | 2007 | 4 | 0 |
| Tunisia | 2008 | 5 | 0 |
| Tunisia | 2009 | 0 | 0 |
| Tunisia | 2010 | 3 | 0 |
| Total | | 46 | 1 |

Score and result list Tunisia's goal tally first, score column indicates score after Nafti goal.

International goal scored by Mehdi Nafti
| No. | Date | Venue | Opponent | Score | Result | Competition |
|---|---|---|---|---|---|---|
| 1 | 4 June 2005 | Botswana National Stadium, Gaborone, Botswana | Botswana | 1–1 | 3–1 | 2006 World Cup qualification |

== Managerial statistics ==
As of 13 November 2026

Managerial record by team and tenure
| Team | Nat | From | To | Record | | | | | | | | Ref |
| Team | Nat | From | To | G | W | D | L | GF | GA | GD | Win % | Ref |
|---|---|---|---|---|---|---|---|---|---|---|---|---|
| Marbella | (Spain) | 10 June 2016 | 7 March 2017 | 28 | 14 | 7 | 7 | 39 | 33 | +6 | 50.00 | |
| Mérida | (Spain) | 27 June 2017 | 20 December 2017 | 20 | 6 | 7 | 7 | 19 | 21 | −2 | 30.00 | |
| Mérida | (Spain) | 12 March 2018 | 28 May 2018 | 11 | 3 | 5 | 3 | 9 | 9 | +0 | 27.27 | |
| Badajoz | (Spain) | 30 October 2018 | 3 February 2020 | 57 | 30 | 14 | 13 | 77 | 46 | +31 | 52.63 | |
| Lugo | (Spain) | 14 October 2020 | 28 February 2021 | 24 | 8 | 9 | 7 | 27 | 26 | +1 | 33.33 | |
| Leganés | (Spain) | 31 October 2021 | 5 June 2022 | 32 | 13 | 11 | 8 | 45 | 39 | +6 | 40.63 | |
| Levante | (Spain) | 12 June 2022 | 10 October 2022 | 9 | 2 | 4 | 3 | 8 | 7 | +1 | 22.22 | |
| Wydad | (Morocco) | 2 January 2023 | 26 February 2023 | 12 | 6 | 4 | 2 | 10 | 4 | +6 | 50.00 | |
| Alcorcón | (Spain) | 5 December 2023 | 3 June 2024 | 25 | 7 | 10 | 8 | 16 | 22 | −6 | 28.00 | |
| Al-Khor | (Qatar) | 16 October 2024 | 19 March 2025 | 14 | 2 | 1 | 11 | 17 | 32 | −15 | 14.29 | |
| Ponferradina | (Spain) | 26 November 2025 | Present | 43 | 17 | 14 | 12 | 42 | 37 | +5 | 39.53 | |
| Total | | | | 275 | 108 | 86 | 81 | 309 | 276 | +33 | 39.27 | — |

== Honours ==
Tunisia

- Africa Cup of Nations: 2004
