= Thomas Grekos =

Greek footballer

Personal information
- Date of birth: 18 April 1991 (age 35)
- Place of birth: Thessaloniki, Greece
- Height: 1.72 m (5 ft 7 1/2 in)
- Position: Right back

Youth career
- 2008–2009: Aris

Senior career*
Years	Team	Apps	(Gls)
2009–2011	Aris	1	(0)
2010–2011	→ Makedonikos (loan)	19	(0)
2011–2012	Zakynthos	8	(0)
2013–2014	Ethnikos Neo Agioneri	24	(2)
2014–2015	Paniliakos	7	(0)
2015	Ethnikos Neo Agioneri	11	(1)
2015–2016	Zakynthos	16	(0)
2016–2017	Panelefsiniakos	31	(0)
2017–2018	Sparti	20	(0)
2018	Agrotikos Asteras	11	(0)
2019	Irodotos	19	(1)
2019–2022	Olympiacos Volos	52	(1)
- * Club domestic league appearances and goals as of 17 April 2022

Thomas Grekos (Greek: Θωμάς Γραικός, born 18 April 1991) is a Greek professional footballer who plays as a right back.

== Career ==
Grekos made his debut with Aris on 16 May 2010 in a match against Olympiacos. He also played for Makedonikos, Zakynthos and Ethnikos Neo Agioneri.
