= Marco Aurélio (footballer, born 1983) =

Brazilian footballer

Personal information
- Full name: Marco Aurélio
- Date of birth: 27 March 1983 (age 43)
- Place of birth: São Paulo, Brazil
- Height: 1.82 m (6 ft 0 in)
- Position: Left back

Senior career*
Years	Team	Apps	(Gls)
2000–2001	Atlético Taquaritinga	?	(0)
2003–2006	Corinthians	1	(0)
2006–2007	União São João	?	(0)
2007–2009	Aris	26	(2)
2009	Panserraikos	11	(0)
2009	Portuguesa	9	(0)
2010	Rio Claro-SP	4	(0)
2010–2011	Veria	27	(0)
2011–2012	Olympiakos Nicosia	31	(1)
2012–2014	Ethnikos Achna	64	(10)
2014–2015	Nea Salamina	16	(0)
2015–2016	Aris Limassol	32	(4)
2016	AEZ Zakakiou	15	(1)
2017–2018	Aris Limassol	52	(7)
2018	Luftëtari	9	(0)
- * Club domestic league appearances and goals as of 20:19, 29 August 2018 (UTC)

Marco Aurélio Ribeiro Barbieri simply Marco Aurélio (born 27 March 1983 in São Paulo) is a retired Brazilian footballer who played as a left back.

Aurélio has previously played in the Super League Greece for Aris and Panserraikos.
