= Marián Kelemen =

Slovak footballer

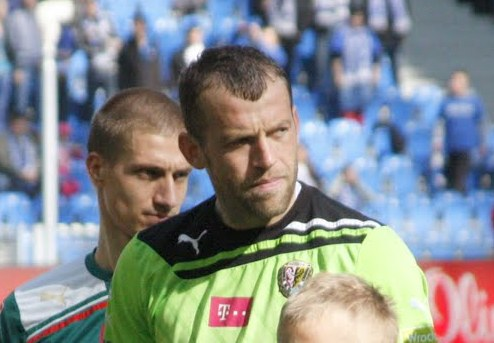
- Kelemen as a Śląsk Wrocław player (2012)

Personal information
- Full name: Marián Kelemen
- Date of birth: 7 December 1979 (age 46)
- Place of birth: Michalovce, Czechoslovakia
- Height: 1.88 m (6 ft 2 in)
- Position: Goalkeeper

Youth career
- 1987–1991: NAC
- BSC Bardejov
- Laugaricio
- FC Senec
- 1992–1993: Slovan Bratislava

Senior career*
| Years | Team | Apps | (Gls) |
| 1993–1999 | Slovan Bratislava | 48 | (0) |
| 1999–2003 | Bursaspor | 64 | (0) |
| 2003–2004 | Slovan Bratislava | 23 | (0) |
| 2004 | Ventspils | 13 | (0) |
| 2004–2006 | Tenerife | 52 | (0) |
| 2006–2007 | Vecindario | 38 | (0) |
| 2007–2009 | Aris | 16 | (0) |
| 2009 | Numancia | 11 | (0) |
| 2010–2014 | Śląsk Wrocław | 117 | (1) |
| 2015 | Příbram | 15 | (0) |
| 2015–2016 | Zemplín | 26 | (0) |
| 2016–2021 | Jagiellonia Białystok | 113 | (0) |
- * Club domestic league appearances and goals

Marián Kelemen (born 7 December 1979) is a Slovak former professional footballer who played as a goalkeeper.

== Club career ==
Born in Michalovce, Czechoslovakia, Kelemen played in no fewer than seven clubs as a youth, having started at local MFK Zemplín. He began his professional career with national powerhouse ŠK Slovan Bratislava and, in January 2002, signed with Bursaspor from Turkey.

After returning to his country and Slovan, Kelemen soon joined Latvia's FK Ventspils. In the summer of 2004, he embarked in a Spanish adventure that would last three years, as he represented CD Tenerife and UD Vecindario, both in the Canary Islands and Segunda División.

In 2007, following Vecindario's relegation, Kelemen moved to Aris Thessaloniki FC. In January 2009, not being first-choice for the Greek, he returned to Spain, this time to its La Liga, signing with CD Numancia until the end of the season, which ended in relegation – he conceded five goals in the first half of his sole appearance, at Racing de Santander.

In January 2010, Kelemen signed for Śląsk Wrocław, being a starter for the vast majority of his spell. On 29 May 2011, he helped trounce 5–0 Arka Gdynia at home by scoring his team's last goal through a penalty kick.

== Honours ==
Ventspils

- Latvian Cup: 2003

Śląsk Wrocław

- Ekstraklasa: 2011–12

Individual

- Ekstraklasa Player of the Month: April 2011
