= Darío Fernández =

Argentine footballer

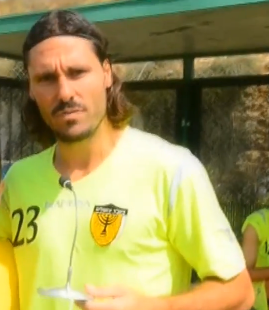
- Fernández with Beitar Jerusalem in 2013

Personal information
- Full name: Darío Ezequiel Fernández
- Date of birth: 24 September 1978 (age 48)
- Place of birth: Punta Alta, Argentina
- Height: 1.80 m (5 ft 11 in)
- Position: Midfielder

Senior career*
Years	Team	Apps	(Gls)
1997–2000	Sporting Punta Alta	10	(3)
2000–2001	Independiente Rivadavia	11	(3)
2001–2002	Olimpo	18	(3)
2002–2003	Quilmes	26	(3)
2004	Cobreloa	20	(3)
2004	Godoy Cruz	13	(2)
2005	Chacarita Juniors	25	(3)
2005–2008	Panionios	66	(10)
2008–2011	Beitar Jerusalem	38	(1)
2009–2010	→ Aris (loan)	28	(0)
2011	Alki Larnaca	26	(3)
2012–2013	Beitar Jerusalem	35	(0)
2013–2014	Hapoel Haifa	11	(0)
2014–2015	Hapoel Afula	23	(0)
2015–2016	Olympiacos Volos	11	(0)
Total		400	(27)
- * Club domestic league appearances and goals

Darío Ezequiel Fernández (born 24 September 1978) is an Argentine former professional footballer who played as a midfielder in Argentina, Chile, Greece, Israel and Cyprus.

== Honours ==
Beitar Jerusalem

- Israel State Cup: 2008–09
