= César Ortiz =

Spanish footballer

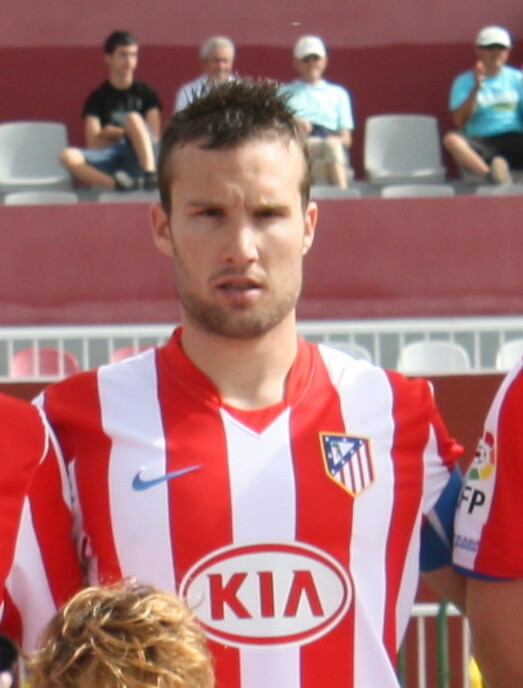
- Ortiz with Atlético Madrid B in 2009

Personal information
- Full name: César Ortiz Puentenueva
- Date of birth: 30 January 1989 (age 37)
- Place of birth: Toledo, Spain
- Height: 1.82 m (6 ft 0 in)
- Position: Centre-back

Youth career
- 2004–2007: Atlético Madrid

Senior career*
Years	Team	Apps	(Gls)
2007–2013	Atlético Madrid B	141	(11)
2009	→ Albacete (loan)	10	(0)
2010	→ Aris (loan)	2	(0)
2013–2014	Vaslui	15	(1)
2014–2017	Rheindorf Altach	51	(3)
2017–2019	Mattersburg	54	(1)
2019–2022	Toledo	48	(1)
Total		321	(17)

International career
2006	Spain U17	5	(0)
2008	Spain U19	5	(0)
- * Club domestic league appearances and goals

César Ortiz Puentenueva (born 30 January 1989) is a Spanish former professional footballer who played as a centre-back.

== Club career ==
Born in Toledo, Castilla–La Mancha, Ortiz played youth football with Atlético Madrid. He only represented the B team as a senior, going on to spend five full seasons in the Segunda División B. Additionally, he split 2009–10 on loan, to Albacete Balompié and Aris Thessaloniki FC, his first match as a professional occurring on 29 August 2009 as he featured the full 90 minutes for the former club in a 3–0 Segunda División away loss against Rayo Vallecano.

Ortiz cut ties with Atlético in the summer of 2013, signing with Liga I side FC Vaslui. After one year in Romania, he joined SC Rheindorf Altach of the Austrian Football Bundesliga on a one-year contract.

Ortiz scored his first professional goal in Austria on 2 August 2015, but in a 3–1 defeat at FK Austria Wien. In January 2017, he moved to SV Mattersburg in the same league.

On 5 July 2019, Ortiz returned to Spain, going on to spend several seasons in the lower leagues with his hometown club CD Toledo before leaving in January 2022 due to injury problems.
