= Michal Peškovič =

Slovak footballer (born 1982)

Personal information
- Full name: Michal Peškovič
- Date of birth: 8 February 1982 (age 44)
- Place of birth: Partizánske, Czechoslovakia
- Height: 1.88 m (6 ft 2 in)
- Position: Goalkeeper

Youth career
- 1991–1994: Klatova Nova Ves
- 1994–1998: Tempo Partizánske

Senior career*
Years	Team	Apps	(Gls)
1998–2001	Tempo Partizánske		
2001–2004	Nitra		
2004–2005	Veľký Lapáš		
2005–2008	ViOn Zlaté Moravce	28	(0)
2008–2009	Polonia Bytom	39	(0)
2009–2010	Aris Thessaloniki	7	(0)
2011–2013	Ruch Chorzów	47	(0)
2013–2014	Viborg	32	(0)
2014–2015	Podbeskidzie	21	(0)
2015	Neftchi Baku	2	(0)
2016–2017	Korona Kielce	8	(0)
2017–2020	Cracovia	69	(0)
2020–2022	Podbeskidzie	25	(0)
Total		278	(0)

Managerial career
- 2023: Podbeskidzie (goalkeeping coach)
- 2024: Podbeskidzie (goalkeeping coach)
- * Club domestic league appearances and goals

Michal Peškovič (born 8 February 1982) is a Slovak former professional footballer who played as a goalkeeper. He was most recently the goalkeeping coach of Podbeskidzie Bielsko-Biała.

== Career ==
In the past he was a player of Tempo Partizánske, Nitra, OFK Veľký Lapáš, ViOn Zlaté Moravce, Polonia Bytom and Aris Thessaloniki.

In January 2011, he joined Ruch Chorzów on a one-year contract.

In August 2015, Peškovič signed a six-month contract with Azerbaijan Premier League side Neftchi Baku.

On 3 November 2020, he rejoined Podbeskidzie Bielsko-Biała.

== Personal life ==
His brother is Boris Peškovič, a former goalkeeper.
