= Cristian Nasuti =

Argentine footballer

Personal information
- Full name: Cristian Javier Nasuti
- Date of birth: 6 September 1982 (age 44)
- Place of birth: San Martín, Argentina
- Height: 1.81 m (5 ft 11 in)
- Position: Centre-back

Senior career*
Years	Team	Apps	(Gls)
2001–2002	Platense	20	(0)
2003–2011	River Plate	54	(2)
2005–2006	→ Morelia (loan)	50	(3)
2008–2009	→ Banfield (loan)	29	(0)
2009–2010	→ Aris (loan)	28	(1)
2010–2011	→ AEK Athens (loan)	18	(0)
2011–2012	Libertad	2	(1)
2012–2014	Emelec	55	(3)
2014–2015	Deportivo Cali	57	(1)
2016–2017	Vélez Sarsfield	37	(2)
2017	Olimpo	10	(0)
2018	Lorca	5	(0)

Managerial career
- 2025–2026: Emelec (assistant)
- 2025: Emelec (interim)
- 2026: Emelec (interim)
- 2026: Emelec
- * Club domestic league appearances and goals

Cristian Javier Nasuti (born 6 September 1982) is an Argentine football coach and former player who played as a centre-back.

== Career ==
Nasuti started his career with Platense in the Argentine Primera B Nacional (Second Division) in 2001. He was spotted by River Plate and signed for the club in 2003. On November 30 of that year, Nasuti made his official debut in the Argentine Primera División in a road game against Lanús. The defender scored the equalizer in the last minutes of the 2004 Copa Libertadores semifinals against Boca Juniors, although his team ended up losing the series on penalties. Weeks later, he won with River the 2004 Clausura.

Later, Nasuti moved to Mexico on loan to play for Monarcas Morelia between 2005 and 2006, but returned to River after making 50 appearances for Morelia. In the winter of 2008, he transferred to Banfield where he made 29 appearances in Primera.

After a successful season in Greece with Aris, Nasuti stayed in the Greek Super League for one more year, signing a one-year loan deal with AEK Athens.

The defender went on to play for Libertad (Paraguay), Emelec (Ecuador) and Deportivo Cali (Colombia), winning first division titles with the latter two.

In 2016, Nasuti returned to Argentina to play for Vélez Sarsfield. He scored his first goal in a 2–1 victory against Olimpo for the second fixture of the 2016 Argentine Primera División.

== Honours ==
River Plate

- Argentine Primera División: 2004 Clausura, 2008 Clausura

AEK Athens

- Greek Cup: 2010–11

Emelec

- Ecuadorian Serie A: 2013, 2014

Deportivo Cali

- Categoría Primera A: 2015 Apertura
