= Toni Calvo =

Spanish footballer

Personal information
- Full name: Antonio Calvo Arandes
- Date of birth: 28 March 1987 (age 39)
- Place of birth: Barcelona, Spain
- Height: 1.71 m (5 ft 7 1/2 in)
- Position: Winger

Team information
- Current team: Santboià

Youth career
- 1997–1999: Gramenet
- 1999–2006: Barcelona

Senior career*
Years	Team	Apps	(Gls)
2005–2007	Barcelona C	25	(3)
2006–2007	Barcelona B	11	(0)
2007–2011	Aris	89	(12)
2011	→ Parma (loan)	3	(0)
2011–2012	Levski Sofia	20	(7)
2012–2016	Anorthosis	94	(12)
2016–2017	Veria	19	(1)
2018	Vilafranca		
2019	Young Talent Badalona		
2019–2020	Santboià		

International career
2002	Spain U16	3	(0)
2004	Spain U17	2	(0)
2005–2006	Spain U19	7	(2)
2007	Spain U20	4	(0)
- * Club domestic league appearances and goals as of 1 October 2018

Antonio "Toni" Calvo Arandes (born 28 March 1987) is a Spanish former professional footballer who played as a winger.

He spent the better part of his career with Aris (Greece) and Anorthosis (Cyprus).

== Club career ==
=== Barcelona / Aris ===
Born in Barcelona, Catalonia, Calvo joined FC Barcelona's La Masia academy at the age of 12. He made his senior debut in the 2006–07 season, totalling 385 minutes of play (only one start) as the reserves suffered relegation from the Segunda División B.

Calvo signed with Greek side Aris Thessaloniki F.C. in summer 2007, agreeing to a three-year contract and reuniting with Barcelona teammate Javito (and several others overall, including manager Quique Hernández). On 29 November, he scored in a 1–1 away draw against Bolton Wanderers in the group stage of the UEFA Cup.

In August 2009, Calvo renewed his contract with the Thessaloniki club for a further two years. He netted six times across all competitions during that season, five in the Super League and one in the cup, as the team finished fifth in the former competition.

=== Parma / Bulgaria ===
On 27 December 2010, Parma F.C. confirmed Calvo had joined on loan until the end of the campaign. He made his Serie A debut on 6 January of the following year in a 4–1 win at Juventus FC where he came on as a substitute for Sebastian Giovinco, but only collected two further league appearances during his spell.

On 18 July 2011, Calvo moved to PFC Levski Sofia from Bulgaria on a one-year deal. He made his competitive debut on 4 August, in the Europa League qualifying round 2–1 defeat of FC Spartak Trnava, and first appeared in the league four days later, setting up the winning goal for Ivan Tsvetkov in a 1–0 home victory over PFC Slavia Sofia; he scored his first goal for the club on 21 October, in a 3–2 win against PFC Kaliakra Kavarna.

=== Anorthosis ===
In July 2012, Calvo moved to the Cypriot First Division with Anorthosis Famagusta F.C., requesting to be released at the end of the season due to the fact he was the player with the highest salary on the team and the club was facing economic problems. President Savvas Kakos obliged, but the player eventually returned for the following campaign with a much revised contract.

=== Later years ===
On 6 July 2016, Calvo returned to Greece and its top level by agreeing to a one-year deal with Veria F.C. for an undisclosed fee. He took his game to the Catalan regional leagues in 2018 and, the following year, had a failed trial at Niki Volos.

== International career ==
Overall, Calvo earned 16 caps for Spain at youth level. He represented the under-20 team at the 2007 FIFA World Cup in Canada, playing four times for the quarter-finalists.

== Club statistics ==
As of 4 January 2017

Club	Season	League			Cup		Continental		Total	
Club	Season	Division	Apps	Goals	Apps	Goals	Apps	Goals	Apps	Goals
Barcelona B	2006–07	Segunda División B	11	0	—		—		11	0
Aris	2007–08	Super League Greece	25	4			—		25	4
Aris	2008–09	Super League Greece	25	3			2 (Note: Appearances in UEFA Europa League)	0	27	3
Aris	2009–10	Super League Greece	30	5	3	1	—		33	6
Aris	2010–11	Super League Greece	9	0	1	0	6	2	16	2
Aris	Total		89	12	4	1	8	2	101	15
Parma (loan)	2010–11	Serie A	3	0	0	0	—		3	0
Levski Sofia	2011–12	First Professional League	20	7	2	1	1	0	23	8
Anorthosis	2012–13	Cypriot First Division	21	3	4	0	3	2	28	5
Anorthosis	2013–14	Cypriot First Division	26	3	2	0	0	0	28	3
Anorthosis	2014–15	Cypriot First Division	24	5	2	0	—		26	5
Anorthosis	2015–16	Cypriot First Division	23	1	3	0	—		26	1
Anorthosis	Total		94	12	11	0	4	2	109	14
Veria	2016–17	Super League Greece	6	1	1	0	0	0	7	1
Career total			223	32	18	2	12	4	253	38

== Honours ==
Spain U19

- UEFA European Under-19 Championship: 2006
