= Diogo Siston =

Brazilian footballer (born 1981)

Personal information
- Full name: Diogo Rodrigues Siston
- Date of birth: January 25, 1981 (age 45)
- Place of birth: Rio de Janeiro, Brazil
- Height: 1.74 m (5 ft 9 in)
- Position: Attacking midfielder

Team information
- Current team: Olaria

Senior career*
Years	Team	Apps	(Gls)
1999–2003	Vasco da Gama	25	(1)
2003–2004	Hapoel Be'er Sheva	29	(1)
2004–2007	C.D. Santa Clara	66	(9)
2007–2009	Aris	39	(2)
2009–2010	Levadeiakos	13	(0)
2010	Ionikos	13	(1)
2011	Macaé	7	(1)
2011–	Olaria		
- * Club domestic league appearances and goals

Diogo Rodrigues Siston (born January 25, 1981), is a Brazilian-Portuguese football midfielder who currently plays for Olaria Atlético Clube. He played in Brazil national team U-15, U-17 and U-20. During this period he was teammate of players like Ronaldinho, Kaka, Adriano, Maicon and others famous players.

At his peak of his professional career in Brazil he played in Vasco da Gama with big names of world football like Romário, Bebeto and others. In Europe his peak of career was for Greek clubs including Aris, Levadeiakos and Ionikos.
