= Thiago Gentil =

Brazilian footballer (born 1980)

Personal information
- Full name: Tiago Gentil
- Date of birth: 8 April 1980 (age 46)
- Place of birth: São Paulo, Brazil
- Height: 1.80 m (5 ft 11 in)
- Position: Forward

Youth career
- 1997–1999: Palmeiras
- 2000: Santa Cruz

Senior career*
Years	Team	Apps	(Gls)
2001	Náutico		
2001–2004	Palmeiras		
2002–2003	→ Al-Ittihad Jeddah (loan)		
2005	Daegu	23	(4)
2005–2006	Santa Cruz	8	(0)
2006–2007	Alavés	11	(0)
2007	Figueirense	16	(2)
2008–2009	Aris Thessaloniki	32	(2)
2009	Coritiba	16	(1)
2010–2011	Nacional	16	(0)
2012	Grêmio Barueri	8	(1)
2013	Guarani	10	(2)
- * Club domestic league appearances and goals as of 15:17, 13 September 2013 (UTC)

Thiago Gentil (born 8 April 1980) is a Brazilian footballer who plays as a forward.

== Playing career ==
Gentil started his career of at Náutico and joined Palmeiras, who had been relegated to the Campeonato Brasileiro Série B. Gentil was sent on loan to Saudi Arabia where he played for Al-Ittihad Club. In 2005, he was sold to K League 1 club Daegu FC. Later that year, he returned to Brazil and played for Santa Cruz.

He caught the eye of Spanish side Deportivo Alavés, and in the summer of 2006 he signed a 3-year contract with the club with annual wages starting at 800,000 Euros. He performed well in his first season at the club, however the financial problems faced by Alavés owner Dmitry Pietrman forced him to come back to his homeland at the club of Figueirense.

At Figueirense, he was scouted by Greek side Aris Thessaloniki, one of the biggest sides in the country. His most notable moment at the club was when he scored a last minute equaliser against AEK Athens in Athens. However, contract was up in the summer of 2009. He spent the rest of his career playing in his native Brazil for Coritiba, Grêmio Barueri and Guarani, though he signed for Nacional in Portugal during the 2010 winter transfer window on a free transfer. Gentil retired at the end of the 2013 season.
