= Koke (footballer, born 1983) =

Spanish footballer (born 1983)

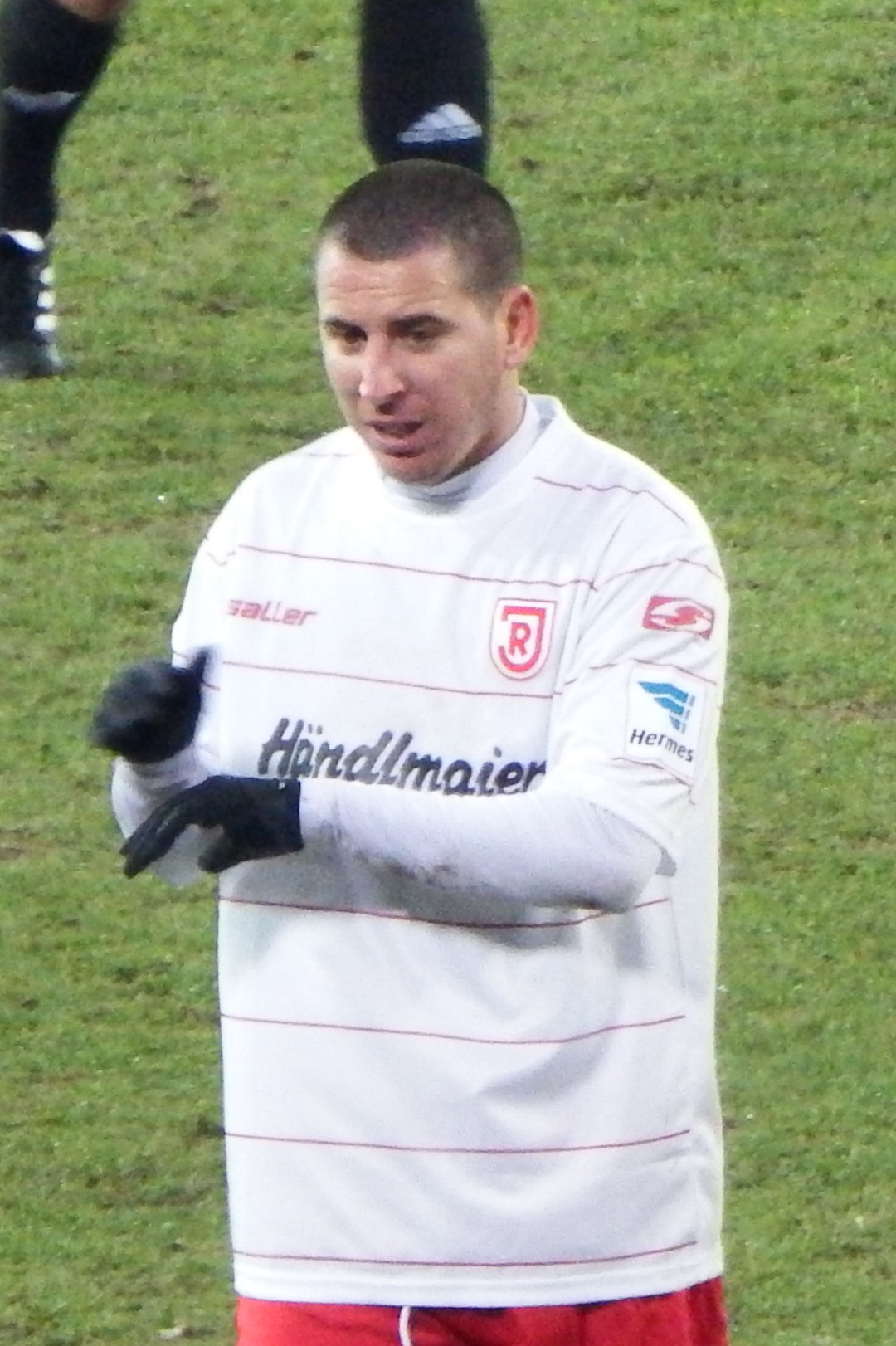
- Koke playing for Jahn Regensburg

Personal information
- Full name: Sergio Contreras Pardo
- Date of birth: 27 April 1983 (age 43)
- Place of birth: Málaga, Spain
- Height: 1.79 m (5 ft 10 in)
- Position: Forward

Youth career
- Málaga

Senior career*
Years	Team	Apps	(Gls)
2001–2004	Málaga B	43	(5)
2002–2004	Málaga	6	(1)
2004	→ Marseille (loan)	10	(0)
2004–2006	Marseille	33	(6)
2006	→ Sporting CP (loan)	6	(2)
2006–2011	Aris	138	(30)
2011	Houston Dynamo	7	(1)
2011–2012	Rayo Vallecano	5	(1)
2012	Baku	10	(2)
2013	Jahn Regensburg	9	(3)
2013–2014	Blooming	26	(2)
2014–2015	NorthEast United	12	(4)
2015	Veria	0	(0)
2015–2016	Aris	3	(1)
Total		308	(58)
- * Club domestic league appearances and goals

Sergio Contreras Pardo (born 27 April 1983), known as Koke, is a Spanish former professional footballer who played as a forward.

In a much-travelled career, he represented clubs in Spain, France, Portugal, Greece, the United States, Azerbaijan, Germany, Bolivia and India. He was best known for his tenure at Aris, which lasted six seasons over two separate spells.

== Club career ==
=== Málaga ===
Born in Málaga, Koke started his football career at hometown club Málaga CF, being essential as the B team reached the Segunda División for the first time their history in 2003.

On 23 February 2003, he scored a late equaliser in a 1–1 home draw against RC Celta de Vigo in La Liga, where he appeared in six games, five from the bench, totalling 176 minutes for the Andalusians during the season.

=== Marseille ===
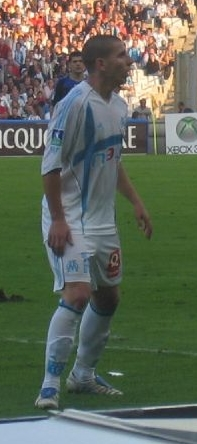
Koke playing for Marseille

In January 2004, after seeing very little playing time in the first team, barred by veteran Salva, Koke joined Ligue 1 club Olympique de Marseille, playing ten times without scoring the remainder of the season. The following one was much better, with him netting five goals in 24 appearances.

In the 2005–06 campaign, with the arrival of Mamadou Niang (in August 2005) and Toifilou Maoulida (in January 2006), Koke was deemed surplus to requirements, scoring one goal in nine league matches and, in January 2006, was sent on loan to Sporting CP where he played almost no part in the club's season, although he did find the net twice as a substitute against Gil Vicente F.C. on 5 March, in a 2–0 home win.

=== Aris ===
The arrival – initially on loan – of Djibril Cissé in August 2006 meant the end of Koke's adventure in France. He would eventually sign for Aris Thessaloniki FC, a team that was filled with Spanish players, in a three-year deal. He produced the best football of his career in years, scoring ten league goals for a team that finished fourth in the league after being promoted the previous season.

In 2007–08, Koke netted another ten in Super League's regular season, adding one in the UEFA Cup group stage game against Red Star Belgrade. In July 2008, he signed a new five-year contract while also attaining vice-captaincy, second to Konstantinos Nebegleras, and becoming himself captain in the 2009–10 campaign.

=== Houston Dynamo ===
Koke signed with Major League Soccer club Houston Dynamo on 15 April 2011. He joined the team officially 11 days later, after being awarded his international transfer certificate.

On 29 April 2011, Koke made his debut for his new team, coming on as a late substitute in a 4–1 win against D.C. United. However, after failing to settle in Houston and struggling in the league, he had his contract termination request accepted by the club on 30 May, leaving the club after little more than a month.

=== Return to Spain ===
Koke returned to Spain in September 2011, signing with Rayo Vallecano, recently promoted to the top division. On 23 October, in his very first appearance, he scored his first goal for the Madrid club: after having replaced Piti midway through the second half of the away fixture against Real Betis, he netted the final 2–0 in the 88th minute through a penalty kick.

Koke was released in the 2012 January transfer window.

=== FK Baku ===
In February 2012, Koke joined Azerbaijan Premier League side FC Baku. He played a total of 15 matches in his only season and scored four goals, including one in the final of the Azerbaijan Cup which was won.

Koke was released in the summer.

=== Later career ===
On the last day of the 2013 January transfer window, Koke joined SSV Jahn Regensburg in the 2. Bundesliga. On 26 July, he changed teams and countries again, signing a one-year contract with Club Blooming from the Liga de Fútbol Profesional Boliviano.

On 15 September 2014, Koke moved to NorthEast United FC. He scored the game's only goal against the Kerala Blasters FC to mark his Indian Super League debut, and The Times of India subsequently wrote about the match: "The roar of the crowd could be heard a kilometre away from the Indira Gandhi Athletic Stadium".

On 11 September 2015, Koke was released on a free transfer and signed with Veria FC. The following month, without having appeared in any competitive matches, he re-joined former club Aris.

== Personal life ==
In November 2019, Koke was arrested in Estepona on suspicion of heading a drugs ring. A total of 30 people including his brother and girlfriend were detained in the same operation; he left pre-trial detention in July 2021 by paying a €15,000 bond.

== Career statistics ==
Appearances and goals by club, season and competition
Club	Season	League			National cup		Continental		Other		Total	
Club	Season	Division	Apps	Goals	Apps	Goals	Apps	Goals	Apps	Goals	Apps	Goals
Houston Dynamo	2011	Major League Soccer	7	1	0	0	–		–		7	1
Rayo Vallecano	2011–12	La Liga	5	1	1	0	–		–		6	1
Baku	2011–12	Azerbaijan Premier League	10	2	5	4	–		–		15	4
Jahn Regensburg	2012–13	2. Bundesliga	9	3	0	0	–		–		9	3
Club Blooming	2013–14	Bolivian Primera División	26	2	–		2	0	–		28	2
NorthEast United	2014	Indian Super League	12	4	–		–		–		12	4
Career total			69	13	6	2	2	0	0	0	77	15

== Honours ==
Málaga

- UEFA Intertoto Cup: 2002

Marseille

- UEFA Intertoto Cup: 2005
- Coupe de France runner-up: 2005–06

Aris

- Greek Football Cup runner-up: 2007–08, 2009–10

FK Baku

- Azerbaijan Cup: 2011–12
