= Neto (footballer, born 1981) =

Brazilian footballer

Personal information
- Full name: Darcy Dolce Neto
- Date of birth: February 7, 1981 (age 45)
- Place of birth: São José do Rio Preto, Brazil
- Height: 1.75 m (5 ft 9 in)
- Positions: Right back; winger

Youth career
- 1997–1999: América-SP

Senior career*
Years	Team	Apps	(Gls)
2000–2001	Ituano	3	(0)
2002	Atlético Sorocaba	7	(0)
2003–2004	Botafogo-SP	12	(0)
2004–2005	Inter de Limeira	12	(0)
2005	Paraná	36	(5)
2006–2007	Santos	7	(0)
2006	→ Fluminense (Loan)	8	(0)
2007–2012	Aris	129	(13)
2012–2013	Bahia	24	(2)
2014–2016	Veria	27	(1)
2016–2018	Aris	16	(2)
- * Club domestic league appearances and goals as of 10 June 2018

Darcy Dolce Neto, or simply Neto (born February 7, 1981), is a retired Brazilian football right-back.

== Attributes ==
Neto played as a right-sided defender and midfielder. During his four-season tenure with Aris, he was a designated free-kick taker and scored five goals from free kicks.

== Career ==
At one season, during his spell in Santos, was considered and pronounced as one of the leading right backs in Campeonato Brasileiro Série A. Also spent a couple of seasons on loan to some clubs in Brazil, before joining Aris in 2007. His transfer fee was about 200,000 euros. He immediately established himself into starting lineup, replacing another Brazilian full back Tuta from a season before. In summer 2009, was rumoured to be linked to Bolton Wanderers and a couple of more clubs from better leagues in Europe.

On December 8, 2009, he extended his contract up to 2013, which had been about to expire in summer 2010. At post contract-signing press conference, he declared himself as an Aris fan, loving this club. He unofficially rejected offers from a couple of Greek and clubs from abroad, saying that had he ever considered a move from Aris, that would have been only a club out of Greek boundaries, putting an end to any speculation about his potential departure. He was considered one of club's top and most consistent stars.

At the end of his contract (at the 2012–2013 Super League end) he was very close to signing with APOEL from Cyprus, but the next couple of days the Cypriots saw him sign with Bahia from Brazil.

On 27 January 2015, Neto returned to Greece as a player of Veria He signed a six-month contract. He made his official debut in a 0–2 away win against Levadiakos Veria didn't renew yet his contract but he was on a trial to the club. Neto failed on his trial, he's contact was not registered to Super League Greece and the player was released.

On 4 September 2015, Neto was signed again by Veria as a free spot for non-EU players was created.

In July 2016, Neto returned to Aris to finish his career with the team he loved.
