= Ronaldo Guiaro =

Brazilian footballer (born 1974)

Personal information
- Date of birth: 18 February 1974 (age 52)
- Place of birth: Piracicaba, Brazil
- Height: 1.86 m (6 ft 1 in)
- Position: Centre-back

Team information
- Current team: XV de Piracicaba (assistant)

Senior career*
Years	Team	Apps	(Gls)
1993–1994	Guarani		
1994–1996	Atlético Mineiro	8	(0)
1996–2001	Benfica	111	(4)
2001–2005	Beşiktaş	110	(8)
2005–2007	Santos	42	(0)
2007–2011	Aris	84	(3)
Total		387	(15)

International career
1996	Brazil Olympic	13	(1)
1996	Brazil	1	(0)

Managerial career
- 2015–2017: XV de Piracicaba U20
- 2017: XV de Piracicaba
- 2022–: XV de Piracicaba (assistant)
Medal record
Men's Football
Bronze medal – third place	1996 Atlanta	Team competition
- * Club domestic league appearances and goals

Ronaldo Guiaro (born 18 February 1974) is a Brazilian professional football coach and former player who is the assistant coach of XV de Piracicaba. As a player, he was a centre-back who began his career at Guarani and went on to spend most of his playing years in Europe, notably for Benfica and Beşiktaş.

== Club career ==
Born in Piracicaba, São Paulo, Ronaldo started playing with Guarani, moving to Atlético Mineiro shortly after. In 1996, aged 22, he joined S.L. Benfica in Portugal, backing up Jorge Bermúdez and Hélder Cristóvão in his first season but became the club's first-choice afterwards as they failed to win any silverware.

After five seasons with Benfica, Ronaldo signed for Beşiktaş J.K. in Turkey. There, he was also an undisputed starter for the majority of his spell. In the 2002–03 season, he only missed one match in the Süper Lig as the Istanbul team won the title after eight years.

Aged 31, Ronaldo returned to his native Brazil. But two years later, he moved abroad again to join Aris in the Super League Greece as a defensive mainstay. He played for the Greek club for several seasons, helping them qualify three times to the UEFA Cup, now known as the UEFA Europa League.

== International career ==
Ronaldo represented the bronze medal-winning Brazil squad at the 1996 Summer Olympics, playing in all matches. Another Ronaldo was also present in the squad, but he wore "Ronaldinho" (meaning "little Ronaldo") on the back of his shirt since Ronaldo was two years older than him. He also made one appearance for the senior team in 1996.

== Honours ==
Atlético Mineiro

- Campeonato Mineiro: 1995

Benfica

- Taça de Portugal runner-up: 1996–97

Beşiktaş

- Süper Lig: 2002–03
- Turkish Cup runner-up: 2001–02

Santos

- Campeonato Paulista: 2006, 2007

Aris

- Greek Football Cup runner-up: 2007–08, 2009–10

Brazil

- Summer Olympic Games: Bronze medal 1996

Individual

- Beşiktaş J.K. Squads of Century (Silver Team)
