= Athanasios Prittas =

Greek footballer

Personal information
- Date of birth: 9 January 1979 (age 47)
- Place of birth: Thessaloniki, Greece
- Height: 1.83 m (6 ft 0 in)
- Position: Midfielder

Senior career*
| Years | Team | Apps | (Gls) |
| 1997–1999 | Poseidon Michanionas | 34 | (4) |
| 1999–2005 | Skoda Xanthi | 97 | (5) |
| 2005–2007 | Iraklis | 41 | (2) |
| 2007–2012 | Aris | 71 | (2) |
| 2012–2013 | Panthrakikos | 3 | (0) |
| 2013 | Skoda Xanthi | 6 | (0) |
| 2013–2014 | Kavala | 5 | (0) |
| Total | | 257 | (13) |
- * Club domestic league appearances and goals

Athanasios "Sakis" Prittas (Greek: Αθανάσιος "Σάκης" Πρίττας; born 9 January 1979) is a Greek former professional footballer who played as a midfielder.

== Club career ==
Prittas began his career in Poseidon Michanionas. In Michaniona he played 34 matches and scored 4 goals, amongst them a famous goal to eliminate AEK Athens in the Greek Football Cup. He then moved to Skoda Xanthi, where he stayed from 1999 to 2005. He established himself as one of the key players in the team, playing in 97 league games and scoring 5 goals. In 2005, Prittas moved to Salonica to play for Iraklis, where he stayed for 2 seasons before moving to city rivals Aris. He has played about 80 matches and scored 2 goals in the yellow-black jersey. He is loved special from the team's fans. For many, he is the leader in center. He is good at passing and marking-heading, and he is very passioned in every game, something who makes him dear for the fans. But in November 2011, he stayed out from team's mission for 3 consecutive matches, and has problems with coach Michal Probierz. He also made things harder, when in one interview, he said public what he felt.

== International career ==
On 1 June 2010, he was named in the 23-man squad for the 2010 FIFA World Cup, although he did not feature in any game during the tournament.
