= Javito =

Spanish footballer

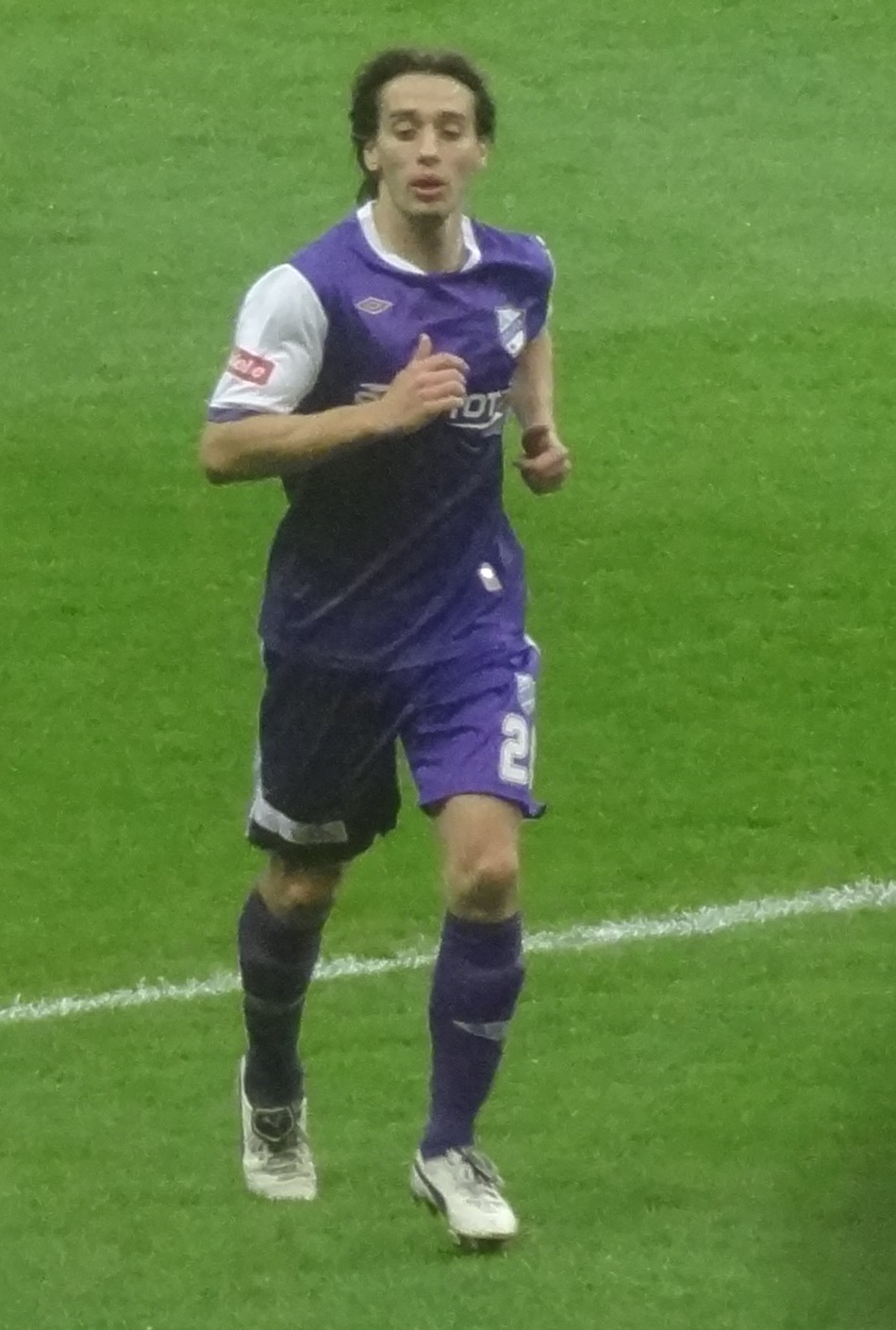
- Javito in action for Orduspor

Personal information
- Full name: Francisco Javier Peral Periane
- Date of birth: 4 November 1983 (age 43)
- Place of birth: Moraleja, Spain
- Height: 1.75 m (5 ft 9 in)
- Position: Winger

Youth career
- Moraleja
- 2001–2002: Barcelona

Senior career*
| Years | Team | Apps | (Gls) |
| 2001–2006 | Barcelona C | 67 | (10) |
| 2004–2006 | Barcelona B | 53 | (12) |
| 2004 | Barcelona | 1 | (0) |
| 2006–2011 | Aris | 124 | (15) |
| 2011–2012 | Olympiacos | 4 | (1) |
| 2012 | → Orduspor (loan) | 14 | (1) |
| 2013 | Hércules | 12 | (0) |
| 2013–2014 | Alcorcón | 23 | (4) |
| 2014–2015 | Kerkyra | 30 | (4) |
| 2015–2016 | Panthrakikos | 21 | (0) |
| 2017 | Guijuelo | 8 | (0) |
| 2017–2020 | Coria | 92 | (12) |
| 2020–2022 | Moraleja | 42 | (18) |

International career
| 2005 | Spain U21 | 1 | (0) |
- * Club domestic league appearances and goals

Francisco Javier Peral Periane (born 4 November 1983), known as Javito, is a Spanish former professional footballer who played as a winger.

== Club career ==
=== Barcelona ===
Born in Moraleja, Province of Cáceres, Extremadura, Javito joined FC Barcelona's youth system at the age of 17, signing from his local club. He made his professional debuts with their reserves, playing two seasons in Segunda División B and scoring a career-best ten goals in 29 games in his first.

Javito made his official debut for the first team on 7 December 2004, in a UEFA Champions League group stage match against FC Shakhtar Donetsk, playing the first half of the 0–2 away loss. However, he was unable to become a regular member of the main squad partly due to a long period on the sidelines as a result of thrombosis.

=== Aris ===
Javito joined Aris in the summer of 2006, being the first of several Spaniards that would move to the Greek club in the following years as a result of the solid relationships between agent Manel Ferrer – an Aris collaborator – and the Spanish transfer market. He immediately established himself in the side's starting XI, helping them to the fourth position in the Super League just one year after promoting.

In the 2007–08 playoffs, Javito netted twice in a 4–0 home win against AEK Athens. Previously, on 4 October 2007, he scored in a 1–2 loss at Real Zaragoza as his team won 2–2 on aggregate and qualified to the group stages in the UEFA Cup.

After his solid late performances for Aris, as his contract was due to expire, Javi signed for a further three years, earning an approximate annual wage of €180.000. He started the 2008–09 campaign in great individual form, and scored the winning goal against Olympiacos on 26 October 2008 (1–0), breaking the ten-year record of invincibility that their opponents held at the Kleanthis Vikelidis Stadium.

On 16 September 2010, Javito scored the game's only goal at home against Europa League title holders Atlético Madrid, and also played the full 90 minutes in the second game at the Vicente Calderón Stadium (3–2 win) with the Greek eventually finishing second in the group stage at the expense of precisely the opposition.

=== Deportivo, Olympiakos ===
On 31 January 2011, Javito returned to his country and joined La Liga club Deportivo de La Coruña. He would not make one single appearance during his four-month spell due to bureaucratic problems, which included the lack of his signature in the document sent to FIFA, with the Galicians eventually being relegated.

Javito returned to Greece in ensuing off-season as he signed with Olympiacos, which again featured several compatriots as manager Ernesto Valverde. In September 2012, his contract was terminated.

=== Back to Spain ===
In late December 2012, Javito signed with Segunda División side Hércules CF. He contributed with nine starts until the end of the season (748 minutes of action), moving to fellow league club AD Alcorcón subsequently.

=== Return to Greece ===
In summer 2014, Javito returned to Greece and its top level, agreeing to a one-year deal with PAE Kerkyra. The following year, he signed a one-year contract with fellow league club Panthrakikos FC.

== International career ==
Javito earned his only cap for the Spain under-21 team on 7 June 2005, coming on as a late substitute for Jaime Gavilán in a 4–2 win against Bosnia and Herzegovina for the 2006 UEFA European Championship qualifiers.

== Career statistics ==
As of 14 May 2017

Appearances and goals by club, season and competition
| Club | Season | League | | | Cup | | Other | | Total | |
| Club | Season | Division | Apps | Goals | Apps | Goals | Apps | Goals | Apps | Goals |
|---|---|---|---|---|---|---|---|---|---|---|
| Barcelona B | 2004–05 | Segunda División B | 29 | 10 | — | | — | | 29 | 10 |
| Barcelona B | 2005–06 | Segunda División B | 24 | 2 | — | | — | | 24 | 2 |
| Barcelona B | Total | | 53 | 12 | 0 | 0 | 0 | 0 | 53 | 12 |
| Barcelona | 2004–05 | La Liga | 0 | 0 | 0 | 0 | 1 (Note: Appearances in UEFA Champions League) | 0 | 1 | 0 |
| Aris | 2006–07 | Super League Greece | 18 | 3 | 0 | 0 | 0 | 0 | 18 | 3 |
| Aris | 2007–08 | Super League Greece | 28 | 4 | 3 | 1 | 6 (Note: Appearances in UEFA Europa League) | 1 | 37 | 6 |
| Aris | 2008–09 | Super League Greece | 29 | 5 | 2 | 0 | 2 | 0 | 33 | 5 |
| Aris | 2009–10 | Super League Greece | 30 | 1 | 7 | 2 | — | | 37 | 3 |
| Aris | 2010–11 | Super League Greece | 19 | 2 | 1 | 0 | 10 | 1 | 30 | 3 |
| Aris | Total | | 124 | 15 | 13 | 3 | 18 | 2 | 155 | 20 |
| Deportivo (loan) | 2010–11 | La Liga | 0 | 0 | 0 | 0 | — | | 0 | 0 |
| Olympiacos | 2011–12 | Super League Greece | 4 | 1 | 1 | 0 | — | | 5 | 1 |
| Orduspor (loan) | 2011–12 | Süper Lig | 14 | 1 | 7 | 2 | — | | 21 | 3 |
| Hércules | 2012–13 | Segunda División | 12 | 0 | 0 | 0 | — | | 12 | 0 |
| Alcorcón | 2013–14 | Segunda División | 23 | 4 | 4 | 1 | — | | 27 | 5 |
| Kerkyra | 2014–15 | Super League Greece | 30 | 4 | 5 | 2 | — | | 35 | 6 |
| Panthrakikos | 2015–16 | Super League Greece | 21 | 0 | 2 | 0 | — | | 23 | 0 |
| Guijuelo | 2016–17 | Segunda División B | 8 | 0 | 0 | 0 | — | | 8 | 0 |
| Career total | | | 289 | 37 | 32 | 8 | 19 | 2 | 340 | 47 |
