= 2017–18 Copa del Rey =

116th Copa del Rey

Tournament details
- Country: Spain
- Teams: 83

Final positions
- Champions: Barcelona (30th title)
- Runners-up: Sevilla

Tournament statistics
- Matches played: 112
- Goals scored: 307 (2.74 per match)
- Top goal scorer(s): Víctor Curto (6 goals)

The 2017–18 Copa del Rey was the 116th staging of the Copa del Rey (including two seasons where two rival editions were played). The winners were assured a place for the 2018–19 UEFA Europa League group stage.

Barcelona were the three-time defending champions, and successfully defended their title following a 5–0 win over Sevilla in the final. Times up to 28 October 2017 and from 25 March 2018 are CEST (UTC+2). Times from 29 October 2017 to 24 March 2018 are CET (UTC+1).

== Schedule and format ==
Round	Draw date	Date	Fixtures	No. of Clubs	Format details
First Round	28 July 2017	30 August 2017	18	83 → 65	New entries: Clubs participating in Tercera and Segunda División B gained entry. Byes: Seven teams from Segunda División B received a bye. Opponents seeding: Teams faced each other according to proximity criteria. Local team seeding: Draw of lots. Knock-out tournament type: Single match Copa Federación qualification: losers qualified for 2017–18 Copa Federación, National phase.
Second round	28 July 2017	6 September 2017	22	65 → 43	New entries: Clubs participating in Segunda División gained entry. Byes: One Segunda División B team received a bye. Opponents seeding: Segunda División teams faced each other. Local team seeding: Draw of lots. Knock-out tournament type: Single match
Third round	8 September 2017	20 September 2017	11	43 → 32	Byes: One team from Segunda División B or Tercera División which previously did not receive a bye, received one. Opponents seeding: Segunda División teams faced each other. Local team seeding: Draw of lots. Knock-out tournament type: Single match
Round of 32	28 September 2017	25 October 2017	16	32 → 16	New entries: Clubs participating in La Liga gained entry. Opponents seeding: The seven teams from La Liga which qualified for 2017–18 UEFA competitions, faced the remaining seven teams from Segunda División B and Tercera División. The five Segunda División teams played against La Liga teams. The eight remaining La Liga teams faced each other. Local team seeding: First leg at home of team in lower division. Knock-out tournament type: Double match
Round of 32	28 September 2017	29 November 2017	16	32 → 16	New entries: Clubs participating in La Liga gained entry. Opponents seeding: The seven teams from La Liga which qualified for 2017–18 UEFA competitions, faced the remaining seven teams from Segunda División B and Tercera División. The five Segunda División teams played against La Liga teams. The eight remaining La Liga teams faced each other. Local team seeding: First leg at home of team in lower division. Knock-out tournament type: Double match
Round of 16	5 December 2017	3 January 2018	8	16 → 8	Opponents seeding: Draw of lots. Local team seeding: First leg at home of the team in the lower division. Knock-out tournament type: Double match
Round of 16	5 December 2017	10 January 2018	8	16 → 8	Opponents seeding: Draw of lots. Local team seeding: First leg at home of the team in the lower division. Knock-out tournament type: Double match
Quarter-finals	12 January 2018	17 January 2018	4	8 → 4	Opponents seeding: Draw of lots. Local team seeding: Luck of the draw. Knock-out tournament type: Double match
Quarter-finals	12 January 2018	24 January 2018	4	8 → 4	Opponents seeding: Draw of lots. Local team seeding: Luck of the draw. Knock-out tournament type: Double match
Semi-finals	26 January 2018	31 January 2018	2	4 → 2	Opponents seeding: Draw of lots. Local team seeding: Luck of the draw. Knock-out tournament type: Double match
Semi-finals	26 January 2018	7 February 2018	2	4 → 2	Opponents seeding: Draw of lots. Local team seeding: Luck of the draw. Knock-out tournament type: Double match
Final	26 January 2018	21 April 2018	1	2 → 1	Single match, stadium TBD by RFEF. UEFA Europa League qualification: winners qualified for the 2018–19 UEFA Europa League group stage.

Notes

- Double-match rounds enforced the away goals rule, single-match rounds did not.
- Games ending in a tie were decided in extra time, and if still level, by a penalty shoot-out.

== Qualified teams ==
The following teams qualified for the competition. Reserve teams were excluded.

La Liga the 20 teams of the 2016–17 season	Segunda División the 21 non-reserve teams of the 2016–17 season	Segunda División B the top five non-reserve teams of each group and the four with the highest number of points 2016–17 season excluding reserve teams	Tercera División the best non-reserve team of each one of the eighteen groups of the 2016–17 season
Alavés; Athletic Bilbao; Atlético Madrid; Barcelona; Celta Vigo; Deportivo La Coruña; Eibar; Espanyol; Granada; Las Palmas; Leganés; Málaga; Osasuna; Real Betis; Real Madrid; Real Sociedad; Sevilla; Sporting Gijón; Valencia; Villarreal	Alcorcón; Almería; Cádiz; Córdoba; Elche; Getafe; Gimnàstic; Girona; Huesca; Levante; Lugo; Mallorca; Mirandés; Numancia; Oviedo; Rayo Vallecano; Reus; Tenerife; UCAM Murcia; Valladolid; Zaragoza	Albacete; Alcoyano; Atlético Baleares; Badalona; Cartagena; Cultural Leonesa; Fuenlabrada; Hércules; Leioa; Lleida Esportiu; Lorca FC; Marbella; Melilla; Mérida; Murcia; Ponferradina; Pontevedra; Racing Ferrol; Racing Santander; Real Unión; Rayo Majadahonda; Toledo; Villanovense; UD Logroñés	Antequera; Arcos; Avilés; Cacereño; Calahorra; Cultural Durango; Formentera; Gimnástica Segoviana; Gimnástica Torrelavega; Lorca Deportiva; Olímpic; Olot; Peña Sport; Rápido de Bouzas; Talavera de la Reina; Tarazona; UD San Fernando; Unión Adarve

== First round ==
The draw for the first and the second round was held on 28 July 2017 at 13:00 CEST in La Ciudad del Fútbol, RFEF headquarters, in Las Rozas, Madrid. In this round, 32 teams from the 2016–17 Segunda División B and ten from the 2016–17 Tercera División teams gained entry. In the draw, firstly six teams from Segunda División B received a bye and then, the remaining teams this league and teams from Tercera División faced according to proximity criteria by next groups:

- Atlético Baleares, Racing Ferrol, Hércules, Alcoyano, Fuenlabrada, Mallorca, and Mérida received a bye to the second round.

30 August 2017	Calahorra (4)	1–0	Real Unión (3)	Calahorra
18:00	Cristian 4'	Report		Stadium: La Planilla; Attendance: 500; Referee: Recio Moreno

30 August 2017	Peña Sport (3)	1–2	Mirandés (3)	Tafalla
19:00	Socorro 29'	Report	Camacho 73'; Cervero 90+3'	Stadium: San Francisco; Attendance: 300; Referee: González Esteban

30 August 2017	Badalona (3)	2–2 (a.e.t.) (1–3 p)	Elche (3)	Badalona
19:00	Rubén Sánchez 19' (pen.); Rivas 37'	Report	Lolo Pla 65' (pen.); Kaba 75'	Stadium: Municipal; Attendance: 1,500; Referee: Sánchez Alba
	Penalties
	Albarrán (penalty missed); Serramitja (penalty missed); Kevin (penalty scored); Cosme (penalty missed)		(penalty missed) Gonzalo; (penalty scored) Iván Calero; (penalty scored) Benja; (penalty scored) Collantes

30 August 2017	Gimnástica Segoviana (3)	2–0	Pontevedra (3)	Segovia
20:00	Ayrton 21'; Dani Calleja 65' (pen.)	Report		Stadium: La Albuera; Attendance: 1,340; Referee: Fuente Martín

30 August 2017	Leioa (3)	2–1	Racing Santander (3)	Leioa
20:00	Eneko 28', 89'	Report	Héber 70' (pen.)	Stadium: Sarriena; Attendance: 200; Referee: Hernández Lorenzo

30 August 2017	Gimnástica Torrelavega (4)	0–3	Cultural Durango (4)	Torrelavega
20:15		Report	Ekain 1'; Beñat 38'; Ekaitz Molina 71'	Stadium: El Malecón; Attendance: 400; Referee: Fernández Buergo

30 August 2017	Ponferradina (3)	2–0	Rápido de Bouzas (3)	Ponferrada
20:30	Álvaro Moreno 19'; Ríos 81'	Report		Stadium: El Toralín; Attendance: 2,500; Referee: Gálvez Rascón

30 August 2017	UD Logroñés (3)	4–0	Avilés (4)	Logroño
20:30	Rayco 21' (pen.); Ñoño 54'; Ramiro 70'; Soti 89'	Report		Stadium: Las Gaunas; Attendance: 2,610; Referee: Díez Cano

30 August 2017	Olímpic (4)	1–1 (a.e.t.) (4–5 p)	Olot (3)	Xàtiva
20:30	Carrascosa 49'	Report	Mas 6'	Stadium: La Murta; Attendance: 750; Referee: Mohamed Massat
	Penalties
	Trujillo (penalty scored); Yeray (penalty scored); Tobías (penalty missed); Ducó (penalty scored); Javi Boix (penalty scored)		(penalty scored) Pedro del Campo; (penalty scored) Héctor Simón; (penalty scored) Barnils; (penalty scored) Alfredo; (penalty scored) Mas

30 August 2017	Murcia (3)	3–1	Cacereño (4)	Murcia
20:30	Víctor Curto 26', 42', 55'	Report	Carlos López 48' (pen.)	Stadium: Nueva Condomina; Attendance: 4,350; Referee: Montero de Lerma

30 August 2017	Lleida Esportiu (3)	1–0	Melilla (3)	Lleida
20:30	Iván Agudo 71'	Report		Stadium: Camp d'Esports; Attendance: 400; Referee: Bosch Domènech

30 August 2017	Rayo Majadahonda (3)	0–1	Unión Adarve (3)	Majadahonda
20:45		Report	Fran García 60'	Stadium: Cerro del Espino; Attendance: 800; Referee: Sánchez Sánchez

30 August 2017	Antequera (4)	2–0	Arcos (4)	Antequera
20:45	Luisillo 50'; Juanillo 56'	Report		Stadium: El Maulí; Attendance: 2,000; Referee: Santos Pargaña

30 August 2017	Lorca Deportiva (3)	3–1	Villanovense (3)	Lorca
20:45	Luismi 15', 69'; Pedro 18'	Report	Allyson 87'	Stadium: Francisco Artés Carrasco; Attendance: 1,350; Referee: Guzmán Mansilla

30 August 2017	UD San Fernando (4)	1–2 (a.e.t.)	Marbella (3)	Maspalomas
21:00 (20:00 UTC+1)	Karim 58'	Report	Ferrón 66'; José Alonso 114'	Stadium: Ciudad Deportiva; Attendance: 1,000; Referee: Muñoz Piedra

30 August 2017	Cartagena (3)	2–1 (a.e.t.)	UCAM Murcia (3)	Cartagena
21:30	Moisés 67'; Jesús 119'	Report	Isi 83'	Stadium: Cartagonova; Attendance: 5,750; Referee: Mirallés Selma

31 August 2017	Talavera de la Reina (3)	1–0	Toledo (3)	Talavera de la Reina
20:45	Espinar 78' (pen.)	Report		Stadium: El Prado; Attendance: 3,000; Referee: Muñiz Ruiz

6 September 2017	Formentera (3)	1–1 (a.e.t.) (5–4 p)	Tarazona (4)	Sant Francesc Xavier
20:30	Bonilla 90+1'	Report	Casero 90+3'	Stadium: Municipal; Referee: Barceló Roca
	Penalties
	Liñán (penalty scored); Vinícius (penalty scored); Juanan (penalty scored); Nando (penalty scored); Samu (penalty scored)		(penalty scored) Lumbreras; (penalty scored) Escuder; (penalty scored) Jamelli; (penalty scored) Antonio; (penalty missed) Roy

== Second round ==
Formentera received a bye for the third round.

5 September 2017	Gimnàstic (2)	1–1 (a.e.t.) (1–3 p)	Lugo (2)	Tarragona
18:45	Barreiro 5'	Report	Donoso 20'	Stadium: Nou Estadi; Attendance: 3,121; Referee: Varón Aceitón
	Penalties
	Barreiro (penalty scored); Omar (penalty missed); Perone (penalty missed); Jiménez (penalty missed)		(penalty scored) Gil; (penalty scored) Fydriszewski; (penalty scored) Díaz

5 September 2017	Cádiz (2)	1–0	Almería (2)	Cádiz
18:45	Barral 22'	Report		Stadium: Ramón de Carranza; Attendance: 11,530; Referee: Arcediano Monescillo

6 September 2017	Olot (3)	1–0 (a.e.t.)	Alcoyano (3)	Olot
19:00	Alberto Toril 104'	Report		Stadium: Municipal; Attendance: 735; Referee: Monter Solans

6 September 2017	Marbella (3)	1–2	Gimnástica Segoviana (3)	Marbella
20:00	Corpas 27'	Report	Quino 66'; Dani Calleja 72' (pen.)	Stadium: Municipal; Referee: Campos Salinas

6 September 2017	Reus (2)	0–1	Sporting Gijón (2)	Reus
20:00		Report	Nacho Méndez 51'	Stadium: Municipal; Attendance: 2,753; Referee: Ocón Arráiz

6 September 2017	Lorca FC (2)	2–4	Córdoba (2)	Lorca
20:00	Nando 87'; Dani Ojeda 90+1'	Report	Sergi Guardiola 41' (pen.), 46'; Marković 53'; Alfaro 76'	Stadium: Francisco Artés Carrasco; Attendance: 3.726; Referee: De la Fuente Ramos

6 September 2017	Oviedo (2)	0–1	Numancia (2)	Oviedo
20:00		Report	Marc Mateu 18'	Stadium: Carlos Tartiere; Attendance: 10,574; Referee: López Toca

6 September 2017	Mallorca (3)	0–0 (a.e.t.) (3–4 p)	Lleida Esportiu (3)	Palma
20:30		Report		Stadium: Son Moix; Referee: Caparrós Hernández
	Penalties
	Rufo (penalty scored); Cornud (penalty scored); Cano (penalty missed); López (penalty scored); Sevilla (penalty missed)		(penalty scored) Trilles; (penalty scored) Pumar; (penalty scored) Moussa; (penalty scored) Andriu

6 September 2017	Fuenlabrada (3)	2–0	Mérida (3)	Fuenlabrada
20:30	Portilla 30'; Dioni 87'	Report		Stadium: Fernando Torres; Referee: Escudero Marín

6 September 2017	Ponferradina (3)	1–0	Atlético Baleares (3)	Ponferrada
20:30	Cidoncha 56'	Report		Stadium: El Toralín; Attendance: 2,500; Referee: Martínez Santos

6 September 2017	Calahorra (4)	2–0 (a.e.t.)	Leioa (3)	Calahorra
20:30	Barace 94'; Adrien Goñi 103'	Report		Stadium: La Planilla; Referee: Leo Ollo

6 September 2017	UD Logroñés (3)	0–0 (a.e.t.) (8–7 p)	Unión Adarve (3)	Logroño
20:30		Report		Stadium: Las Gaunas; Attendance: 1,000; Referee: Gómez Landazabal
	Penalties
	Ñoño (penalty scored); Muneta (penalty scored); Salvador (penalty scored); Maranhão (penalty scored); Aguilar (penalty scored); Santos (penalty scored); Paredes (penalty missed); Mayor (penalty scored); Sobrón (penalty scored)		(penalty scored) Moreira; (penalty scored) Olmedo; (penalty scored) Bernal; (penalty scored) Mateo; (penalty scored) F. García; (penalty scored) D. García; (penalty missed) Auñón; (penalty scored) Fernández; (penalty missed) Alcalde

6 September 2017	Elche (3)	3–2 (a.e.t.)	Cultural Durango (4)	Elche
20:45	Lolo Pla 42'; Sory 94'; Collantes 101'	Report	Abasolo 18'; Uribesalgo 105'	Stadium: Manuel Martínez Valero; Attendance: 7,115; Referee: Sánchez Villalobos

6 September 2017	Talavera de la Reina (3)	3–1	Antequera (4)	Talavera de la Reina
20:45	Jesús 55', 67'; Cristian 90+4'	Report	Del Pozo 57'	Stadium: El Prado; Attendance: 2,500; Referee: Montes García

6 September 2017	Cartagena (3)	2–1	Mirandés (3)	Cartagena
21:00	Cristo Martín 30'; Chavero 53'	Report	Eloy 61'	Stadium: Cartagonova; Attendance: 5,900; Referee: Yuste Querol

6 September 2017	Hércules (3)	2–1 (a.e.t.)	Lorca Deportiva (3)	Alicante
21:00	Juli 85'; Chechu 101'	Report	Mawi 89'	Stadium: José Rico Pérez; Attendance: 3,500; Referee: Sureda Cuenca

6 September 2017	Huesca (2)	0–2	Valladolid (2)	Huesca
21:00		Report	Óscar Plano 16'; Villalibre 50'	Stadium: El Alcoraz; Attendance: 2,971; Referee: Moreno Aragón

6 September 2017	Murcia (3)	4–1	Racing Ferrol (3)	Murcia
21:30	Álex Ortiz 35'; Elady 55'; Víctor Curto 79', 87'	Report	Gonzalo 71'	Stadium: Nueva Condomina; Attendance: 4,325; Referee: Escriche Guzmán

6 September 2017	Zaragoza (2)	3–0	Granada (2)	Zaragoza
22:00	Borja Iglesias 60'; Eguaras 66'; Pombo 86'	Report		Stadium: La Romareda; Attendance: 10,221; Referee: Eiriz Mata

6 September 2017	Rayo Vallecano (2)	0–3	Tenerife (2)	Madrid
22:00		Report	Juan Carlos 4', 8'; Brian Martín 20'	Stadium: Vallecas; Attendance: 7,286; Referee: Prieto Iglesias

7 September 2017	Alcorcón (2)	2–4	Cultural Leonesa (2)	Alcorcón
20:00	Dumitru 18'; Jonathan Pereira 48'	Report	Isaac 9'; Hugo Álvarez 42' (o.g.); Yelko Pino 57'; Emi 75'	Stadium: Santo Domingo; Attendance: 2,433; Referee: Vicandi Garrido

7 September 2017	Osasuna (2)	3–2 (a.e.t.)	Albacete (2)	Pamplona
22:00	Danny Carvajal 51' (o.g.); Xisco 90+4'; Quique 97'	Report	Bela 66', 73'	Stadium: El Sadar; Attendance: 7,674; Referee: Areces Franco

== Third round ==
Lleida Esportiu received a bye for the round of 32.

19 September 2017	Sporting Gijón (2)	1–1 (a.e.t.) (1–3 p)	Numancia (2)	Gijón
20:00	Šćepović 5'	Report	Higinio 36'	Stadium: El Molinón; Attendance: 13,076; Referee: Gorostegui Fernández-Ortega
	Penalties
	Álex López (penalty missed); Moi Gómez (penalty missed); Santos (penalty scored); Álex Pérez (penalty missed)		(penalty scored) Del Moral; (penalty missed) Medina; (penalty scored) Pere Milla; (penalty scored) Nacho

20 September 2017	Formentera (3)	4–3 (a.e.t.)	UD Logroñés (3)	Sant Francesc Xavier
20:00	Bruno 37'; Kingsley 87'; Dailos 95'; Gabri 105'	Report	Iván Aguilar 52'; Marcos André 72'; Muneta 105' (pen.)	Stadium: Municipal; Referee: Ávalos Barrera

20 September 2017	Córdoba (2)	1–4	Tenerife (2)	Córdoba
20:00	Marković 14'	Report	Brian Martín 17'; Casadesús 34'; Álex Vallejo 59' (o.g.); Aveldaño 90'	Stadium: Nuevo Arcángel; Attendance: 6,857; Referee: Valdés Aller

20 September 2017	Gimnástica Segoviana (3)	0–1	Ponferradina (3)	Segovia
20:15		Report	Caiado 59'	Stadium: La Albuera; Attendance: 1,818; Referee: Ortiz Arias

20 September 2017	Calahorra (4)	1–3	Fuenlabrada (3)	Calahorra
20:30	Barace 60'	Report	Cristóbal 4'; Dioni 28'; Quero 32'	Stadium: La Planilla; Referee: Rezola Etxeberria

20 September 2017	Talavera de la Reina (3)	0–1 (a.e.t.)	Cartagena (3)	Talavera de la Reina
20:45		Report	Jesús 92'	Stadium: El Prado; Referee: Conejero Sánchez

20 September 2017	Hércules (3)	0–1	Elche (3)	Alicante
21:00		Report	Gonzalo 58'	Stadium: José Rico Pérez; Referee: Ripoll Solano

20 September 2017	Cádiz (2)	1–0	Osasuna (2)	Cádiz
21:00	Barral 27'	Report		Stadium: Ramón de Carranza; Attendance: 12,451; Referee: Ais Reig

20 September 2017	Murcia (3)	3–1	Olot (3)	Murcia
21:30	Pedro Martín 27', 77'; Víctor Curto 70'	Report	Héctor Simón 15'	Stadium: Nueva Condomina; Attendance: 6,327; Referee: Mena Gimeno

20 September 2017	Cultural Leonesa (2)	0–4	Valladolid (2)	León
21:00		Report	Cotán 21' (pen.); Gianniotas 50'; Anuar 83'; Villalibre 89'	Stadium: Reino de León; Referee: Pérez Pallás

21 September 2017	Zaragoza (2)	1–0	Lugo (2)	Zaragoza
21:00	Papunashvili 22'	Report		Stadium: La Romareda; Attendance: 11,955; Referee: Cordero Vega

== Final phase ==
The draw for the Round of 32 was held on 28 September 2017, in La Ciudad del Fútbol, Las Rozas de Madrid. In this round, all La Liga teams entered the competition.

Round of 32 pairings were as follows: the seven remaining teams participating in the 2016–17 Segunda División B and Tercera División faced the 2017–18 La Liga teams which qualified for European competitions. The five remaining teams participating in Segunda División faced five La Liga teams which did not qualify for European competitions. The remaining eight La Liga teams faced each other. In matches involving teams from different league tiers, the team in the lower tier played the first leg at home. This rule will also be applied in the Round of 16, but not for the Quarter-finals and Semi-finals, in which the order of legs will be based on the luck of the draw.

Pot 1 Segunda B and Tercera División	Pot 2 European competitions	Pot 3 Segunda División	Pot 4 Rest of Primera División
Cartagena; Elche; Formentera; Fuenlabrada; Lleida Esportiu; Murcia; Ponferradina	Champions League: Atlético Madrid; Barcelona (TH); Real Madrid; Sevilla Europa League: Athletic Bilbao; Real Sociedad; Villarreal	Cádiz; Numancia; Tenerife; Valladolid; Zaragoza	Alavés; Celta Vigo; Deportivo La Coruña; Eibar; Espanyol; Getafe; Girona; Las Palmas; Leganés; Levante; Málaga; Real Betis; Valencia

=== Bracket ===
Round of 32
Valladolid	1	0	1
Leganés	2	1	3
Ponferradina	1	1	2
Villarreal	0	3	3
Numancia	2	1	3
Málaga	1	1	2
Fuenlabrada	0	2	2
Real Madrid	2	2	4
Lleida Esportiu (a)	0	3	3
Real Sociedad	1	2	3
Elche	1	0	1
Atlético Madrid	1	3	4
Cádiz	1	5	6
Real Betis	2	3	5
Cartagena	0	0	0
Sevilla	3	4	7
Tenerife	0	2	2
Espanyol	2	3	5
Girona	0	1	1
Levante	2	1	3
Eibar	1	0	1
Celta Vigo	2	1	3
Murcia	0	0	0
Barcelona	3	5	8
Deportivo La Coruña	1	3	4
Las Palmas	4	2	6
Zaragoza	0	1	1
Valencia	2	4	6
Formentera	1	1	2
Athletic Bilbao	1	0	1
Getafe	0	0	0
Alavés	1	3	4

Round of 16
Leganés (a)	1	1	2
Villarreal	0	2	2
Numancia	0	2	2
Real Madrid	3	2	5
Lleida Esportiu	0	0	0
Atlético Madrid	4	3	7
Cádiz	0	1	1
Sevilla	2	2	4
Espanyol	1	2	3
Levante	1	0	1
Celta Vigo	1	0	1
Barcelona	1	5	6
Las Palmas	1	0	1
Valencia	1	4	5
Formentera	1	0	1
Alavés	3	2	5

Quarter-finals
Leganés (a)	0	2	2
Real Madrid	1	1	2
Atlético Madrid	1	1	2
Sevilla	2	3	5
Espanyol	1	0	1
Barcelona	0	2	2
Valencia (p)	2	1	3
Alavés	1	2	3

Semi-finals
Leganés	1	0	1
Sevilla	1	2	3
Barcelona	1	2	3
Valencia	0	0	0

Final
Sevilla	0
Barcelona	5

== Round of 32 ==
Team 1	Agg.	Team 2	1st leg	2nd leg
Cartagena (3)	0–7	Sevilla (1)	0–3	0–4
Elche (3)	1–4	Atlético Madrid (1)	1–1	0–3
Murcia (3)	0–8	Barcelona (1)	0–3	0–5
Fuenlabrada (3)	2–4	Real Madrid (1)	0–2	2–2
Formentera (3)	2–1	Athletic Bilbao (1)	1–1	1–0
Lleida Esportiu (3)	3–3 (a)	Real Sociedad (1)	0–1	3–2
Ponferradina (3)	1–3	Villarreal (1)	1–0	0–3
Zaragoza (2)	1–6	Valencia (1)	0–2	1–4
Numancia (2)	3–2	Málaga (1)	2–1	1–1
Valladolid (2)	1–3	Leganés (1)	1–2	0–1
Cádiz (2)	6–5	Real Betis (1)	1–2	5–3
Tenerife (2)	2–3	Espanyol (1)	0–0	2–3
Getafe (1)	0–4	Alavés (1)	0–1	0–3
Deportivo La Coruña (1)	4–6	Las Palmas (1)	1–4	3–2
Girona (1)	1–3	Levante (1)	0–2	1–1
Eibar (1)	1–3	Celta Vigo (1)	1–2	0–1

=== First leg ===
24 October 2017	Cartagena	0–3	Sevilla	Cartagena
19:30		Report	Sarabia 25'; Correa 35'; Muriel 51'	Stadium: Cartagonova; Attendance: 7,750; Referee: Trujillo Suárez

24 October 2017	Numancia	2–1	Málaga	Soria
19:30	Nacho 90+3'; Escassi 90+5'	Report	Recio 21'	Stadium: Nuevo Estadio Los Pajaritos; Attendance: 3,403; Referee: Álvarez Izquierdo

24 October 2017	Zaragoza	0–2	Valencia	Zaragoza
20:30		Report	Rodrigo 81'; Parejo 90+1'	Stadium: La Romareda; Attendance: 16,174; Referee: Medié Jiménez

24 October 2017	Getafe	0–1	Alavés	Getafe
20:30		Report	Santos 87'	Stadium: Coliseum; Attendance: 7,731; Referee: Fernández Borbalán

24 October 2017	Murcia	0–3	Barcelona	Murcia
21:30		Report	Alcácer 44'; Deulofeu 52'; Arnaiz 56'	Stadium: Nueva Condomina; Attendance: 19,089; Referee: José Luis Munuera Montero

24 October 2017	Cádiz	1–2	Real Betis	Cádiz
21:30	Álex 21'	Report	León 6', 54'	Stadium: Ramón de Carranza; Attendance: 14,977; Referee: Alberola Rojas

25 October 2017	Formentera	1–1	Athletic Bilbao	Sant Francesc Xavier
19:00	Liñán 60'	Report	García 63'	Stadium: Municipal; Attendance: 2,376; Referee: González Fuertes

25 October 2017	Ponferradina	1–0	Villarreal	Ponferrada
20:30	Cidoncha 37'	Report		Stadium: El Toralín; Attendance: 2,776; Referee: Melero López

25 October 2017	Valladolid	1–2	Leganés	Valladolid
20:30	Cotán 52'	Report	Rico 46'; Beauvue 88'	Stadium: José Zorrilla; Attendance: 7,289; Referee: Gil Manzano

25 October 2017	Elche	1–1	Atlético Madrid	Elche
21:30	Lolo 52' (pen.)	Report	Partey 17'	Stadium: Manuel Martínez Valero; Attendance: 15,080; Referee: Estrada Fernández

25 October 2017	Eibar	1–2	Celta Vigo	Eibar
21:30	Enrich 18'	Report	Cabral 4'; Guidetti 44'	Stadium: Ipurua; Attendance: 3,432; Referee: Undiano Mallenco

26 October 2017	Lleida Esportiu	0–1	Real Sociedad	Lleida
19:30		Report	Canales 32'	Stadium: Camp d'Esports; Attendance: 9,872; Referee: Jaime Latre

26 October 2017	Deportivo La Coruña	1–4	Las Palmas	A Coruña
20:30	Pérez 59'	Report	Momo 8', 16'; Calleri 81', 90'	Stadium: Abanca-Riazor; Attendance: 26,735; Referee: Mateu Lahoz

26 October 2017	Girona	0–2	Levante	Girona
20:30		Report	Boateng 40'; Doukouré 62'	Stadium: Montilivi; Attendance: 6,446; Referee: José María Sánchez Martínez

26 October 2017	Fuenlabrada	0–2	Real Madrid	Fuenlabrada
21:30		Report	Asensio 63' (pen.); Vázquez 80' (pen.)	Stadium: Estadio Fernando Torres; Attendance: 7,200; Referee: Iglesias Villanueva

26 October 2017	Tenerife	0–0	Espanyol	Santa Cruz de Tenerife
21:30 (20:30 UTC+1)		Report		Stadium: Heliodoro Rodríguez López; Attendance: 13,925; Referee: González González

=== Second leg ===
28 November 2017	Málaga	1–1 (2–3 agg.)	Numancia	Málaga
19:30	Adrián 18'	Report	Elgezabal 53'	Stadium: La Rosaleda; Attendance: 13,326; Referee: Aguilar Rodríguez

28 November 2017	Leganés	1–0 (3–1 agg.)	Valladolid	Leganés
19:30	Tito 34'	Report		Stadium: Butarque; Attendance: 5,732; Referee: José Luis Munuera Montero

28 November 2017	Real Madrid	2–2 (4–2 agg.)	Fuenlabrada	Madrid
21:30	Mayoral 62', 70'	Report	Milla 25'; Portilla 89'	Stadium: Santiago Bernabéu; Attendance: 49,638; Referee: González Fuertes

28 November 2017	Levante	1–1 (3–1 agg.)	Girona	Valencia
21:30	Morales 75'	Report	Mojica 33'	Stadium: Ciutat de València; Attendance: 6,858; Referee: Undiano Mallenco

28 November 2017	Celta Vigo	1–0 (3–1 agg.)	Eibar	Vigo
21:30	Aspas 90' (pen.)	Report		Stadium: Balaídos; Attendance: 8,286; Referee: Estrada Fernández

29 November 2017	Sevilla	4–0 (7–0 agg.)	Cartagena	Seville
19:30	Ben Yedder 3', 6'; Ganso 42'; Correa 66'	Report		Stadium: Ramón Sánchez Pizjuán; Attendance: 11,678; Referee: Hernández Hernández

29 November 2017	Barcelona	5–0 (8–0 agg.)	Murcia	Barcelona
19:30	Alcácer 16'; Piqué 56'; Vidal 60'; D. Suárez 74'; Arnáiz 79'	Report		Stadium: Camp Nou; Attendance: 68,775; Referee: Alberola Rojas

29 November 2017	Real Sociedad	2–3 (3–3 (a) agg.)	Lleida Esportiu	San Sebastián
19:30	Llorente 24'; Juanmi 34'	Report	Núñez 56'; Molina 59' (pen.); Radulović 87'	Stadium: Anoeta; Attendance: 8,819; Referee: Juan Martínez Munuera

29 November 2017	Atlético Madrid	3–0 (4–1 agg.)	Elche	Madrid
21:30	Giménez 31'; Torres 33', 68'	Report		Stadium: Wanda Metropolitano; Attendance: 46,723; Referee: Medié Jiménez

29 November 2017	Athletic Bilbao	0–1 (1–2 agg.)	Formentera	Bilbao
21:30		Report	Muñiz 90+6'	Stadium: San Mamés; Attendance: 14,294; Referee: Del Cerro Grande

29 November 2017	Las Palmas	2–3 (6–4 agg.)	Deportivo La Coruña	Las Palmas
21:30 (20:30 UTC±0)	Toledo 58'; Rémy 90+4'	Report	Çolak 42'; Valle 53', 80'	Stadium: Gran Canaria; Attendance: 7,558; Referee: Ricardo de Burgos Bengoetxea

30 November 2017	Alavés	3–0 (4–0 agg.)	Getafe	Vitoria-Gasteiz
19:00	Munir 3', 69'; Bojan 31'	Report		Stadium: Mendizorrotza; Attendance: 9,128; Referee: González González

30 November 2017	Villarreal	3–0 (3–1 agg.)	Ponferradina	Villarreal
19:30	Bakambu 47', 62'; Bacca 64'	Report		Stadium: Estadio de la Cerámica; Attendance: 10,591; Referee: Jaime Latre

30 November 2017	Espanyol	3–2 (3–2 agg.)	Tenerife	Cornellà de Llobregat
19:30	Gerard 36' (pen.); Granero 56'; García 90+1'	Report	Acosta 9'; Juan Carlos 90+3'	Stadium: RCDE Stadium; Attendance: 8,130; Referee: Iglesias Villanueva

30 November 2017	Valencia	4–1 (6–1 agg.)	Zaragoza	Valencia
21:30	Mina 28', 59'; Ibáñez 68'; Vezo 86'	Report	Pombo 87'	Stadium: Mestalla; Attendance: 26,311; Referee: Melero López

30 November 2017	Real Betis	3–5 (5–6 agg.)	Cádiz	Seville
21:30	Boudebouz 8'; Tello 24', 64'	Report	Barral 3'; Romera 18', 41'; García 26' (pen.); Kecojević 78'	Stadium: Benito Villamarín; Attendance: 25,829; Referee: Trujillo Suárez

== Round of 16 ==
Team 1	Agg.	Team 2	1st leg	2nd leg
Formentera (3)	1–5	Alavés (1)	1–3	0–2
Lleida Esportiu (3)	0–7	Atlético Madrid (1)	0–4	0–3
Numancia (2)	2–5	Real Madrid (1)	0–3	2–2
Celta Vigo (1)	1–6	Barcelona (1)	1–1	0–5
Cádiz (2)	1–4	Sevilla (1)	0–2	1–2
Leganés (1)	2–2 (a)	Villarreal (1)	1–0	1–2
Las Palmas (1)	1–5	Valencia (1)	1–1	0–4
Espanyol (1)	3–2	Levante (1)	1–2	2–0

=== First leg ===
3 January 2018	Formentera	1–3	Alavés	Sant Francesc Xavier
19:00	Rosa 57'	Report	Demirović 36', 65'; Munir 81'	Stadium: Municipal; Attendance: 1,100; Referee: Hernández Hernández

3 January 2018	Lleida Esportiu	0–4	Atlético Madrid	Lleida
19:00		Report	Godín 33'; Torres 37'; Costa 69'; Griezmann 90+2'	Stadium: Camp d'Esports; Attendance: 12,532; Referee: Ricardo de Burgos Bengoetxea

3 January 2018	Cádiz	0–2	Sevilla	Cádiz
21:00		Report	Nolito 9'; Navas 23'	Stadium: Ramón de Carranza; Attendance: 17,692; Referee: Mateu Lahoz

3 January 2018	Las Palmas	1–1	Valencia	Las Palmas
21:00 (20:00 UTC±0)	Calleri 36'	Report	Rodrigo 85'	Stadium: Gran Canaria; Attendance: 16,685; Referee: Undiano Mallenco

4 January 2018	Celta Vigo	1–1	Barcelona	Vigo
19:00	Sisto 31'	Report	Arnaiz 15'	Stadium: Balaídos; Attendance: 21,338; Referee: Juan Martínez Munuera

4 January 2018	Leganés	1–0	Villarreal	Leganés
19:00	Amrabat 49'	Report		Stadium: Butarque; Attendance: 9,173; Referee: José María Sánchez Martínez

4 January 2018	Numancia	0–3	Real Madrid	Soria
21:00		Report	Bale 35' (pen.); Isco 89' (pen.); Mayoral 90+1'	Stadium: Los Pajaritos; Attendance: 8,787; Referee: Estrada Fernández

4 January 2018	Espanyol	1–2	Levante	Cornellà de Llobregat
21:00	Gerard 28'	Report	Morales 38' (pen.); Ivi 74'	Stadium: RCDE Stadium; Attendance: 12,602; Referee: Fernández Borbalán

=== Second leg ===
9 January 2018	Atlético Madrid	3–0 (7–0 agg.)	Lleida Esportiu	Madrid
19:30	Carrasco 57'; Gameiro 74'; Vitolo 81'	Report		Stadium: Wanda Metropolitano; Attendance: 28,033; Referee: Alberola Rojas

9 January 2018	Valencia	4–0 (5–1 agg.)	Las Palmas	Valencia
21:30	Vietto 30', 48', 66'; Maksimović 54'	Report		Stadium: Mestalla; Attendance: 27,869; Referee: Del Cerro Grande

10 January 2018	Alavés	2–0 (5–1 agg.)	Formentera	Vitoria-Gasteiz
19:30	Demirović 55'; Pedraza 90+1'	Report		Stadium: Mendizorrotza; Attendance: 8,467; Referee: Iglesias Villanueva

10 January 2018	Villarreal	2–1 (2–2 (a) agg.)	Leganés	Villarreal
19:30	Raba 48'; Cheryshev 89'	Report	El Zhar 31'	Stadium: Estadio de la Cerámica; Attendance: 12,122; Referee: Álvarez Izquierdo

10 January 2018	Real Madrid	2–2 (5–2 agg.)	Numancia	Madrid
21:30	Vázquez 10', 59'	Report	Guillermo 45', 82'	Stadium: Santiago Bernabéu; Attendance: 37,553; Referee: José Luis Munuera Montero

11 January 2018	Sevilla	2–1 (4–1 agg.)	Cádiz	Seville
19:30	Ben Yedder 31'; Correa 54'	Report	García 86'	Stadium: Ramón Sánchez Pizjuán; Attendance: 23,510; Referee: Ricardo de Burgos Bengoetxea

11 January 2018	Levante	0–2 (2–3 agg.)	Espanyol	Valencia
19:30		Report	Baptistão 14'; Gerard 34'	Stadium: Ciutat de València; Attendance: 9,978; Referee: Gil Manzano

11 January 2018	Barcelona	5–0 (6–1 agg.)	Celta Vigo	Barcelona
21:30	Messi 13', 15'; Alba 28'; L. Suárez 31'; Rakitić 87'	Report		Stadium: Camp Nou; Attendance: 59,009; Referee: Hernández Hernández

== Quarter-finals ==
Team 1	Agg.	Team 2	1st leg	2nd leg
Valencia	3–3 (3–2 p)	Alavés	2–1	1–2 (a.e.t.)
Atlético Madrid	2–5	Sevilla	1–2	1–3
Espanyol	1–2	Barcelona	1–0	0–2
Leganés	2–2 (a)	Real Madrid	0–1	2–1

=== First leg ===
17 January 2018	Valencia	2–1	Alavés	Valencia
19:00	Guedes 73'; Rodrigo 82'	Report	Sobrino 66'	Stadium: Mestalla; Attendance: 31,338; Referee: González González

17 January 2018	Atlético Madrid	1–2	Sevilla	Madrid
19:00	Costa 73'	Report	Navas 80'; J. Correa 88'	Stadium: Wanda Metropolitano; Attendance: 51,643; Referee: Jaime Latre

17 January 2018	Espanyol	1–0	Barcelona	Cornellà de Llobregat
21:00	Melendo 88'	Report		Stadium: RCDE Stadium; Attendance: 23,323; Referee: Ricardo de Burgos Bengoetxea

18 January 2018	Leganés	0–1	Real Madrid	Leganés
21:30		Report	Asensio 89'	Stadium: Butarque; Attendance: 11,327; Referee: José María Sánchez Martínez

=== Second leg ===
23 January 2018	Sevilla	3–1 (5–2 agg.)	Atlético Madrid	Seville
21:30	Escudero 1'; Banega 48' (pen.); Sarabia 79'	Report	Griezmann 13'	Stadium: Ramón Sánchez Pizjuán; Attendance: 39,918; Referee: Juan Martínez Munuera

24 January 2018	Alavés	2–1 (a.e.t.) (3–3 agg.) (2–3 p)	Valencia	Vitoria-Gasteiz
19:00	Munir 73'; Sobrino 86'	Report	Mina 77'	Stadium: Mendizorrotza; Attendance: 19,127; Referee: Álvarez Izquierdo
	Penalties
	Pina (penalty scored); Pedraza (penalty missed); Pérez (penalty missed); Munir (penalty scored); Sobrino (penalty missed)		(penalty scored) Rodrigo; (penalty scored) Mina; (penalty missed) Kondogbia; (penalty scored) Gayà

24 January 2018	Real Madrid	1–2 (2–2 (a) agg.)	Leganés	Madrid
21:30	Benzema 47'	Report	Eraso 31'; Gabriel 55'	Stadium: Santiago Bernabéu; Attendance: 46,409; Referee: Gil Manzano

25 January 2018	Barcelona	2–0 (2–1 agg.)	Espanyol	Barcelona
21:30	L. Suárez 9'; Messi 25'	Report		Stadium: Camp Nou; Attendance: 79,774; Referee: Mateu Lahoz

== Semi-finals ==
Team 1	Agg.	Team 2	1st leg	2nd leg
Leganés	1–3	Sevilla	1–1	0–2
Barcelona	3–0	Valencia	1–0	2–0

=== First leg ===
31 January 2018	Leganés	1–1	Sevilla	Leganés
21:30 CET	Siovas 56'	Report	Muriel 21'	Stadium: Butarque; Attendance: 11,454; Referee: González González

1 February 2018	Barcelona	1–0	Valencia	Barcelona
21:30 CET	L. Suárez 67'	Report		Stadium: Camp Nou; Attendance: 50,959; Referee: José María Sánchez Martínez

=== Second leg ===
7 February 2018	Sevilla	2–0 (3–1 agg.)	Leganés	Seville
21:30 CET	Correa 15'; Vázquez 89'	Report		Stadium: Ramón Sánchez Pizjuán; Attendance: 39,705; Referee: Estrada Fernández

8 February 2018	Valencia	0–2 (0–3 agg.)	Barcelona	Valencia
21:30 CET		Report	Coutinho 49'; Rakitić 82'	Stadium: Mestalla; Attendance: 43,355; Referee: Undiano Mallenco

== Final ==
21 April 2018
21:30 CEST

Sevilla	0–5	Barcelona
	Report	L. Suárez 14', 40'; Messi 31'; Iniesta 52'; Coutinho 69' (pen.)

Metropolitano Stadium, Madrid
Attendance: 62,623
Referee: Jesús Gil Manzano

== Top goalscorers ==
Rank	Player	Club	Goals
1	(Spain) Víctor Curto	Murcia	6
2	(Argentina) Joaquín Correa	Sevilla	5
2	(Uruguay) Luis Suárez	Barcelona	5
4	(Spain) Munir	Alavés	4
4	(Argentina) Lionel Messi	Barcelona	4
6	(Spain) José Arnaiz	Barcelona	3
6	(Spain) David Barral	Cádiz	3
6	(France) Wissam Ben Yedder	Sevilla	3
6	(Argentina) Jonathan Calleri	Las Palmas	3
6	(Spain) Juan Carlos	Tenerife	3
6	(Bosnia and Herzegovina) Ermedin Demirović	Alavés	3
6	(Spain) Lolo	Elche	3
6	(Spain) Borja Mayoral	Real Madrid	3
6	(Spain) Santi Mina	Valencia	3
6	(Spain) Gerard Moreno	Espanyol	3
6	(Spain) Rodrigo	Valencia	3
6	(Spain) Lucas Vázquez	Real Madrid	3
6	(Argentina) Luciano Vietto	Valencia	3
