= 2010–11 Aris Thessaloniki F.C. season =

Aris Thessaloniki
- President: Thanasis Athanasiadis
- Manager: Héctor Cúper (until 18 January 2011); Giannis Michalitsos (from 19 January 2011 until 7 March 2011); Sakis Tsiolis (from 11 March 2011)
- Stadium: Kleanthis Vikelidis Stadium
- Super League: 6th
- Greek Cup: Fourth Round
- UEFA Europa League: Round of 32
- Top goalscorer: League: Darcy Dolce Neto (8); All: Darcy Dolce Neto (8)
Home colours	Away colours

Aris Thessaloniki finished in the 6th position of Super League and did not enter in to Play-offs. Trikala eliminated Aris in fourth round of Greek Cup on penalties.

The club started its european campaign from the third qualifying round of UEFA Europa League after finishing fourth in previous season's playoffs. The team advanced to Round of 32 where was eliminated by Manchester City

== Events ==
- 18 January: Héctor Cúper resigned
- 19 January: Giannis Michalitsos hired as caretaker manager
- 7 March: Giannis Michalitsos sacked
- 9 March: Sakis Tsiolis agreed.

== First-team squad ==
#	Name	Nationality	Position(s)	Date of birth (age)	Signed from
Goalkeepers
1	Markos Vellidis	(Greece)	GK	4 April 1987 (aged 24)	(Greece) Diagoras Rodou
13	Michalis Sifakis (captain)	(Greece)	GK	9 September 1984 (aged 26)	(Greece) OFI Crete
25	Juanma Barrero	(Spain)	GK	27 June 1980 (aged 30)	(Spain) AD Alcorcón
Defenders
2	Darcy Dolce Neto	(Brazil)	RB / RW	7 February 1981 (aged 30)	(Brazil) Santos
3	Oriol Lozano	(Spain)	CB	23 May 1981 (aged 30)	(Spain) Racing de Santander
4	Efthymis Kouloucheris	(Greece)	CB / DM	10 March 1981 (aged 30)	(Greece) Olympiacos
5	Ronaldo Guiaro (vice-captain)	(Brazil) / (Portugal)	CB	18 February 1974 (aged 37)	(Brazil) Santos
16	Michel Pereira	(Brazil) / (Italy)	LB / DM	9 June 1981 (aged 29)	(Brazil) Vila Nova
21	Grigoris Papazaharias	(Greece)	LB / RB / DM	20 March 1985 (aged 26)	(Greece) Iraklis
24	Nikos Lazaridis	(Greece)	CB	12 July 1979 (aged 31)	(Greece) Asteras Tripolis
27	Charalampos Oikonomopoulos	(Greece)	CB / DM	9 January 1991 (aged 20)	Club's Academy
29	Giannis Agtzidis	(Greece)	LB	14 October 1992 (aged 18)	Club's Academy
32	Kristi Vangjeli	(Albania)	CB / RB / LB	5 September 1985 (aged 25)	Club's Academy
33	Deividas Česnauskis	(Lithuania)	RB / RM	30 June 1981 (aged 29)	(Greece) Ergotelis
47	Mavroudis Bougaidis	(Greece)	CB / LB / DM	1 June 1993 (aged 17)	Club's Academy
Midfielders
8	Juan Carlos Toja	(Colombia)	AM / CM	24 May 1985 (aged 26)	(Romania) Steaua București
12	Giorgos Katidis	(Greece)	AM / CM	12 February 1993 (aged 18)	Club's Academy
14	Ricardo Faty	(Senegal) / (France)	DM / CM	4 August 1986 (aged 24)	(Italy) Roma
17	Konstantinos Kaznaferis	(Greece)	DM / RB / LB	22 June 1987 (aged 23)	(Greece) PAS Giannina
18	Cristian Portilla	(Spain)	CM / DM	28 August 1988 (aged 22)	(Spain) Sporting Gijón
19	Kostas Mendrinos	(Greece)	CM / DM	28 May 1985 (aged 26)	(Greece) PAS Giannina
26	Danilo Pereira	(Portugal) / (Guinea)	DM / CB	9 September 1991 (aged 19)	(Italy) Parma
55	Sakis Prittas	(Greece)	CM / DM	9 January 1979 (aged 32)	(Greece) Iraklis
Forwards
7	Toni Calvo	(Spain)	RW / LW	28 March 1987 (aged 24)	(Spain) Barcelona B
9	Danijel Cesarec	(Croatia)	ST	8 January 1983 (aged 28)	(Greece) Asteras Tripolis
22	Raúl Bobadilla	(Argentina)	ST / RW / LW	18 June 1987 (aged 23)	(Germany) Borussia Mönchengladbach
23	Christos Aravidis	(Greece)	ST / RW / LW	13 March 1987 (aged 24)	(Greece) Panionios
77	Nery Castillo	(Mexico) / (Uruguay)	RW / LW / ST	13 June 1984 (aged 26)	(Ukraine) Shakhtar Donetsk
88	Daisuke Sakata	(Japan)	SS / RW / LW	16 January 1983 (aged 28)	(Japan) Yokohama F. Marinos
99	Nikos Angeloudis	(Greece)	ST	14 May 1991 (aged 20)	(Greece) Iraklis

== Transfers and loans ==
=== Transfers in ===
Entry date	Position	No.	Player	From club	Fee	Ref.
June 2010	DF	33	(Lithuania) Deividas Česnauskis	(Greece) Ergotelis	Free	
June 2010	DF	24	(Greece) Nikolaos Lazaridis	(Greece) Asteras Tripolis	Free	
June 2010	DF	19	(Greece) Kostas Mendrinos	(Greece) PAS Giannina	Free	
June 2010	GK	1	(Greece) Markos Vellidis	(Greece) Diagoras Rodou	Free	
June 2010	DF	3	(Spain) Oriol Lozano	(Spain) Racing de Santander	Free	
June 2010	DF	16	(Brazil) / (Italy) Michel Pereira	(Brazil) Vila Nova	Free	
June 2010	FW	9	(Croatia) Danijel Cesarec	(Greece) Asteras Tripolis	Free	
July 2010	GK	25	(Spain) Juanma Barrero	(Spain) AD Alcorcón	Free	
July 2010	DF	17	(Greece) Konstantinos Kaznaferis	(Greece) PAS Giannina	Free	
July 2010	FW	11	(Guatemala) Carlos Ruiz	(Mexico) Puebla	Free	
July 2010	DF	21	(Greece) Grigoris Papazaharias	(Greece) Iraklis	Free	
July 2010	FW	99	(Greece) Nikos Angeloudis	(Greece) Iraklis	Free	
July 2010	MF	8	(Colombia) Juan Carlos Toja	(Romania) Steaua București	500.000 €	
August 2010	MF	14	(Senegal) / (Senegal) Ricardo Faty	(Italy) Roma	Free	
September 2010	FW	15	(Spain) Álvaro Portilla	(Spain) Atlético Madrid B	Free	
September 2010	FW	28	(Brazil) Fabiano de Lima	(Austria) Rapid Wien	Free	
January 2011	MF	18	(Spain) Cristian Portilla	(Spain) Sporting de Gijón	Free	
January 2011	FW	88	(Japan) Daisuke Sakata	(Japan) Yokohama F. Marinos	Free	

=== Transfers out ===
Exit date	Position	No.	Player	To club	Fee	Ref.
June 2010	FW	33	(Greece) Stavros Labriakos	Retired		
June 2010	DF	3	(Argentina) / (Spain) Carlos Arano	(Argentina) River Plate	145.000 €	
June 2010	FW	18	(Argentina) Javier Cámpora	Free agent	Released	
July 2010	GK	86	(Brazil) / (Italy) Renato Piovezan	Free agent	Released	
July 2010	MF	30	(Argentina) Roberto Battión	(Argentina) Independiente	Released	
July 2010	MF	17	(France) / (Algeria) Camel Meriem	(France) Arles	Released	
July 2010	GK	40	(Albania) Stivi Frashëri	(Albania) Bylis	Released	
July 2010	FW	99	(Republic of Ireland) / (England) Ian Daly	(Spain) Cádiz	Released	
August 2010	MF	12	(Greece) Vasilios Rovas	Free agent	Released	
January 2011	GK	-	(Slovakia) Michal Peškovič	(Poland) Ruch Chorzów	Released	
January 2011	FW	20	(Spain) Javito Peral	(Greece) Olympiacos	Released	
January 2011	FW	15	(Spain) Álvaro Portilla	(Greece) Rayo Majadahonda	Released	
January 2011	MF	6	(Tunisia) / (France) Mehdi Nafti	Free agent	Released	
February 2011	FW	11	(Guatemala) Carlos Ruiz	(United States) Philadelphia Union	Released	
March 2011	FW	28	(Brazil) Fabiano de Lima	(Ukraine) FC Metalurh Zaporizhya	Released	
April 2011	FW	10	(Spain) Sergio Koke	(United States) Houston Dynamo	Released	

=== Loans in ===
Start date	End date	Position	No.	Player	From club	Fee	Ref.
January 2011	End of season	FW	77	(Mexico) / (Uruguay) Nery Castillo	(Ukraine) Shakhtar Donetsk	None	
January 2011	End of season	MF	26	(Portugal) / (Guinea) Danilo Pereira	(Italy) Parma	None	
January 2011	End of season	FW	22	(Argentina) Raúl Bobadilla	(Germany) Borussia Mönchengladbach	None	

=== Loans out ===
Start date	End date	Position	No.	Player	To club	Fee	Ref.
January 2010	December 2010	MF	11	(United States) / (Ghana) Freddy Adu	(Portugal) Benfica	None	
July 2010	End of season	DF	22	(Greece) Thomas Grekos	(Greece) Makedonikos	None	
July 2010	December 2010	MF	8	(Bolivia) Nacho García	(Cyprus) Anorthosis Famagusta	None	
January 2011	End of season	MF	8	(Bolivia) Nacho García	(Bolivia) Club Bolívar	None	
January 2011	End of season	FW	7	(Spain) Toni Calvo	(Italy) Parma	None	

== Competitions ==
=== Overall ===
Competition	Started round	Current position / round	Final position / round	First match	Last match
Super League 1	Matchday 1	—	6th	29 August 2010	10 April 2011
Greek Cup	Fourth Round	—	Fourth Round	27 October 2010	27 October 2010
Europa League	Third qualifying round	—	Round of 32	29 July 2010	24 February 2011

Updated to match played 10 April 2011
Source: Competitions

=== Overview ===
Competition	Record							
Competition	G	W	D	L	GF	GA	GD	Win %
Super League	30	13	6	11	29	29	+0	43.33
Greek Cup	1	0	1	0	1	1	+0	0.00
Europa League	12	5	4	3	13	12	+1	41.67
Total	43	18	11	14	43	42	+1	41.86

Updated to match played 10 April 2011
Source: Competitions

==== Managers' overview ====
===== Héctor Cúper =====
Competition	Record							
Competition	G	W	D	L	GF	GA	GD	Win %
Super League	18	7	2	9	11	16	−5	38.89
Greek Cup	1	0	1	0	1	1	+0	0.00
Europa League	10	5	3	2	13	9	+4	50.00
Total	29	12	6	11	25	26	−1	41.38

Updated to match played 16 January 2011
Source: Competitions

===== Giannis Michalitsos =====
Competition	Record							
Competition	G	W	D	L	GF	GA	GD	Win %
Super League	7	1	4	2	5	6	−1	14.29
Greek Cup	0	0	0	0	0	0	+0	—
Europa League	2	0	1	1	0	3	−3	0.00
Total	9	1	5	3	5	9	−4	11.11

Updated to match played 7 March 2011
Source: Competitions

===== Sakis Tsiolis =====
Competition	Record							
Competition	G	W	D	L	GF	GA	GD	Win %
Super League	5	5	0	0	13	7	+6	100.00
Greek Cup	0	0	0	0	0	0	+0	—
Europa League	0	0	0	0	0	0	+0	—
Total	5	5	0	0	13	7	+6	100.00

Updated to match played 10 April 2011
Source: Competitions

=== Super League ===
==== Regular season ====
===== League table =====
Pos	Team	Pld	W	D	L	GF	GA	GD	Pts	Qualification or relegation
4	PAOK	30	14	6	10	32	29	+3	48	Qualification for the Play-offs
5	Olympiacos Volos (Note: On 28 July 2011, the Disciplinary Committee of the competition found Olympiacos Volos and Kavala guilty of match-fixing. Therefore the clubs were automatically put at the end of the league table and demoted to the Football League. The decision, however, was lifted on 10 August 2011 after both appealed. Instead of that Olympiacos Volos had 10 points deducted and Kavala 8 for the 2011-2012 season. On 23 August 2011, the Professional Sports Committee stripped Kavala and Olympiacos Volos of their professional licence, due to their chairmen's involvement in the match fixing scandal.) (D)	30	12	11	7	40	28	+12	47	Play-offs and relegation to the Delta Ethniki
6	Aris	30	13	6	11	29	29	0	45	
7	Kavala (D)	30	10	10	10	29	27	+2	40	Relegation to the Delta Ethniki
8	Ergotelis	30	11	6	13	32	38	−6	39	

Source: Super League Greece
Rules for classification: 1) Points; 2) Head-to-head points; 3) Head-to-head goal difference; 4) Play-offs (neutral ground); 7) Draw.
(Note: Criterion 4 is only used if needed to decide champion, teams for relegation or teams for UEFA competitions).
(D) Disqualified

===== Results summary =====
Overall								Home						Away					
Pld	W	D	L	GF	GA	GD	Pts	W	D	L	GF	GA	GD	W	D	L	GF	GA	GD
30	13	6	11	29	29	0	45	7	2	6	14	15	−1	6	4	5	15	14	+1

Last updated: 10 April 2011.
Source: Super League

===== Results by matchday =====
Matchday	1	2	3	4	5	6	7	8	9	10	11	12	13	14	15	16	17	18	19	20	21	22	23	24	25	26	27	28	29	30
Ground	A	H	A	H	A	H	A	H	H	A	H	A	H	A	H	H	A	H	A	H	A	H	A	A	H	A	H	A	H	A
Result	W	L	L	W	W	L	L	W	D	L	W	L	W	D	L	W	L	L	D	D	W	L	D	D	L	W	W	W	W	W
Position	4	8	12	6	3	9	10	7	7	10	6	7	6	6	9	5	7	8	10	8	7	8	9	9	11	7	7	6	6	6

Updated to match(es) played on 10 April 2011. Source: Super League
A = Away; H = Home; W = Win; D = Draw; L = Loss; P = Postponed

===== Matches =====
29 August 2010 1	Kavala	0 – 1	Aris Thessaloniki	Kavala
20:30		Report	Oriol Lozano 28'	Stadium: Anthi Karagianni Stadium; Referee: Michalis Koukoulakis

11 September 2010 2	Aris Thessaloniki	0 – 1	Panathinaikos	Thessaloniki
19:30		Report	Djibril Cissé 43' (pen.)	Stadium: Kleanthis Vikelidis Stadium; Referee: Giorgos Daloukas

19 September 2010 3	Panionios	1 – 0	Aris Thessaloniki	Athens
18:15	Boško Balaban 86'	Report		Stadium: Nea Smyrni Stadium; Referee: Stavros Tritsonis

26 September 2010 4	Aris Thessaloniki	1 – 0	Ergotelis	Thessaloniki
18:15	Danijel Cesarec 90+2'	Report		Stadium: Kleanthis Vikelidis Stadium; Referee: Thanasis Giachos

3 October 2010 5	PAOK	0 – 1	Aris Thessaloniki	Thessaloniki
20:30		Report	Javito Peral 75'	Stadium: Toumba Stadium; Referee: Michalis Tsiniaris

17 October 2010 6	Aris Thessaloniki	0 – 4	AEK Athens	Thessaloniki
20:30		Report	Pantelis Kafes 40'; Ignacio Scocco 58', 68'; Rafik Djebbour 90+3'	Stadium: Kleanthis Vikelidis Stadium; Referee: Anastasios Kakos

24 October 2010 7	Olympiacos	1 – 0	Aris Thessaloniki	Piraeus
20:30	Albert Riera 2'	Report		Stadium: Karaiskakis Stadium; Referee: Christos Mitsios

30 October 2010 8	Aris Thessaloniki	2 – 0	Atromitos	Thessaloniki
17:15	Javito Peral 19'; Nikos Lazaridis 25'	Report		Stadium: Kleanthis Vikelidis Stadium; Referee: Giorgos Stathopoulos

8 November 2010 9	Aris Thessaloniki	1 – 1	AEL	Thessaloniki
17:15	Nikos Lazaridis 54'	Report	Stephen Makinwa 76'	Stadium: Kleanthis Vikelidis Stadium; Referee: Anastasios Sidiropoulos

15 November 2010 10	Iraklis	1 – 0	Aris Thessaloniki	Thessaloniki
19:30	Karim Soltani 74'	Report		Stadium: Kaftanzoglio Stadium; Referee: Giorgos Stathopoulos

21 November 2010 11	Aris Thessaloniki	2 – 0	Kerkyra	Thessaloniki
17:15	Danijel Cesarec 34'; Álvaro Portilla 90+4'	Report		Stadium: Kleanthis Vikelidis Stadium; Referee: Aleksandros Aretopoulos

15 November 2010 12	Panserraikos	1 – 0	Aris Thessaloniki	Serres
17:15	Chumbinho 40'	Report		Stadium: Serres Municipal Stadium; Referee: Stavros Tritsonis

5 December 2010 13	Aris Thessaloniki	1 – 0	Asteras Tripolis	Thessaloniki
17:15	Darcy Dolce Neto 56'	Report		Stadium: Kleanthis Vikelidis Stadium; Referee: Aleksandros Aretopoulos

11 December 2010 14	Olympiacos Volos	1 – 1	Aris Thessaloniki	Volos
17:15	Peter Doležaj 40'	Report	Darcy Dolce Neto 20'	Stadium: Panthessaliko Stadium; Referee: Christos Mitsios

19 December 2010 15	Aris Thessaloniki	0 – 2	Skoda Xanthi	Thessaloniki
15:00		Report	Dimitris Souanis 22', 62'	Stadium: Kleanthis Vikelidis Stadium; Referee: Michalis Voskakis

4 January 2011 16	Aris Thessaloniki	1 – 0	Kavala	Thessaloniki
19:30	Carlos Ruiz 3'	Report		Stadium: Kleanthis Vikelidis Stadium; Referee: Vasilis Pamboridis

8 January 2011 17	Panathinaikos	1 – 0	Aris Thessaloniki	Athens
19:30	Sotiris Ninis 20'	Report		Stadium: Athens Olympic Stadium; Referee: Giorgos Stathopoulos

16 January 2011 18	Aris Thessaloniki	0 – 2	Panionios	Thessaloniki
17:15		Report	Kostas Mitroglou 19', 90+1'	Stadium: Kleanthis Vikelidis Stadium; Referee: Stavros Mantalos

23 January 2011 19	Ergotelis	0 – 0	Aris Thessaloniki	Heraklion
17:15		Report		Stadium: Pankritio Stadium; Referee: Michalis Tsiniaris

30 January 2011 20	Aris Thessaloniki	0 – 0	PAOK	Thessaloniki
19:30		Report		Stadium: Kleanthis Vikelidis Stadium; Referee: Petros Konstantineas

5 February 2011 21	AEK Athens	1 – 2	Aris Thessaloniki	Athens
19:30	Ismael Blanco 51'	Report	Darcy Dolce Neto 28', 75'	Stadium: Athens Olympic Stadium; Referee: Dimitris Thanos

12 February 2011 22	Aris Thessaloniki	1 – 2	Olympiacos	Thessaloniki
19:30	Darcy Dolce Neto 17'	Report	Rafik Djebbour 39'; David Fuster 75'	Stadium: Kleanthis Vikelidis Stadium; Referee: Anastasios Sidiropoulos

20 February 2011 23	Atromitos	0 – 0	Aris Thessaloniki	Athens
17:15		Report		Stadium: Peristeri Stadium; Referee: Stavros Tritsonis

27 February 2011 24	AEL	2 – 2	Aris Thessaloniki	Larissa
19:30	Daniel Cousin 14'; Romeu Pereira 90+3'	Report	Danilo Pereira 33'; Raúl Bobadilla 90'	Stadium: AEL FC Arena; Referee: Stavros Mantalos

5 March 2011 25	Aris Thessaloniki	0 – 1	Iraklis	Thessaloniki
19:30		Report	Victoraș Iacob 87'	Stadium: Kleanthis Vikelidis Stadium; Referee: Andreas Pappas

13 March 2011 26	Kerkyra	3 – 4	Aris Thessaloniki	Corfu
17:15	Goran Maznov 7'; Dimitrios Grammozis 32'; Gustavo Veronesi 77'	Report	Ricardo Faty 27'; Nikos Lazaridis 65'; Nery Castillo 68'; Sergio Koke 76'	Stadium: Kerkyra Stadium; Referee: Anastasios Sidiropoulos

20 March 2011 27	Aris Thessaloniki	3 – 1	Panserraikos	Thessaloniki
19:00	Raúl Bobadilla 15'; Nery Castillo 38'; Darcy Dolce Neto 42'	Report	Bernard Parker 3'	Stadium: Kleanthis Vikelidis Stadium; Referee: Michalis Voskakis

3 April 2011 28	Asteras Tripolis	1 – 2	Aris Thessaloniki	Tripoli
19:00	Daniel Orozco 35'	Report	Sergio Koke 44' (pen.); Nikos Lazaridis 64'	Stadium: Theodoros Kolokotronis Stadium; Referee: Petros Konstantineas

10 April 2011 29	Aris Thessaloniki	2 – 1	Olympiacos Volos	Thessaloniki
19:00	Cristian Portilla 49'; Darcy Dolce Neto 58'	Report	Javier Umbides 32' (pen.)	Stadium: Kleanthis Vikelidis Stadium; Referee: Anastasios Kakos

17 April 2011 30	Skoda Xanthi	1 – 2	Aris Thessaloniki	Xanthi
19:00	Stavros Stathakis 40'	Report	Darcy Dolce Neto 26'; Danilo Pereira 47'	Stadium: Xanthi FC Arena; Referee: Anastasios Sidiropoulos

=== Greek Football Cup ===
==== Fourth Round ====
27 October 2010 Fourth Round	Trikala	1 – 1 (a.e.t.) (4 – 2 p)	Aris Thessaloniki	Trikala
20:00	Christos Mingas 31'	Report	Ronaldo Guiaro 7'	Stadium: Trikala Municipal Stadium; Referee: Michalis Tsiniaris
	Penalties
	Christos Mingas (penalty scored); Charalampos Brilakis (penalty scored); Panagiotis Korbos (penalty scored); Juan Barrientos (penalty scored)		(penalty scored) Kergio Koke; (penalty missed) Mehdi Nafti; (penalty scored) Toni Calvo; (penalty missed) Ronaldo Guiaro

=== UEFA Europa League ===
==== Third qualifying round ====
29 July 2010 First leg	Jagiellonia Białystok (Poland)	1 – 2	(Greece) Aris Thessaloniki	Białystok
21:45	Rafał Grzyb 24'	Report	Toni Calvo 4', 8' (pen.)	Stadium: Stadion Miejski; Attendance: 5,120; Referee: Espen Berntsen (Norway)

5 August 2010 Second leg	Aris Thessaloniki (Greece)	2 – 2 (4–3 agg.)	(Poland) Jagiellonia Białystok	Thessaloniki
20:45	Danijel Cesarec 19', 75' (pen.)	Report	Marcin Burkhardt 25', 66'	Stadium: Kleanthis Vikelidis Stadium; Attendance: 15,139; Referee: Alexandru Deaconu (Romania)

==== Play-off round ====
17 August 2010 First leg	Aris Thessaloniki (Greece)	1 – 0	Austria Wien	Thessaloniki
19:00	Carlos Ruiz 90+3'	Report		Stadium: Kleanthis Vikelidis Stadium; Attendance: 19,040; Referee: Maxim Layushkin (Russia)

26 August 2010 Second leg	Austria Wien	1 – 1 (1–2 agg.)	(Greece) Aris Thessaloniki	Wien
20:00	Roland Linz 56'	Report	Carlos Ruiz 42'	Stadium: Franz Horr Stadium; Attendance: 11,000; Referee: Daniel Stalhammar (Sweden)

==== Group stage ====
===== Group table =====
Pos	Team	Pld	W	D	L	GF	GA	GD	Pts	Qualification
1	(Germany) Bayer Leverkusen	6	3	3	0	8	2	+6	12	Advance to knockout phase
2	(Greece) Aris Thessaloniki	6	3	1	2	7	5	+2	10	Advance to knockout phase
3	(Spain) Atlético Madrid	6	2	2	2	9	7	+2	8	
4	(Norway) Rosenborg	6	1	0	5	3	13	−10	3	

Source: uefa.com

===== Matches =====
16 September 2010 1	Aris Thessaloniki (Greece)	1 – 0	(Spain) Atlético Madrid	Thessaloniki
20:00	Javito Peral 59'	Report		Stadium: Kleanthis Vikelidis Stadium; Attendance: 16,699; Referee: Mark Clattenburg (England)

30 September 2010 2	Rosenborg (Norway)	2 – 1	(Greece) Aris Thessaloniki	Trondheim
22:05	Morten Moldskred 37'; Rade Prica 68'	Report	Carlos Ruiz 43'	Stadium: Lerkendal Stadion; Attendance: 11,016; Referee: Eric Braamhaar (Netherlands)

21 October 2010 3	Aris Thessaloniki (Greece)	0 – 0	(Germany) Bayer Leverkusen	Thessaloniki
22:05		Report		Stadium: Kleanthis Vikelidis Stadium; Attendance: 16,372; Referee: Martin Ingvarsson (Sweden)

4 November 2010 4	Bayer Leverkusen (Germany)	1 – 0	(Greece) Aris Thessaloniki	Leverkusen
20:00	Arturo Vidal 90'	Report		Stadium: BayArena; Attendance: 18,265; Referee: Bruno Paixão (Portugal)

1 December 2010 5	Atlético Madrid (Spain)	2 – 3	(Greece) Aris Thessaloniki	Madrid
22:05	Diego Forlán 11'; Sergio Agüero 16'	Report	Sergio Koke 2', 51' (pen.); Nikos Lazaridis 81'	Stadium: Vicente Calderón Stadium; Attendance: 21,154; Referee: Ivan Bebek (Croatia)

16 December 2010 6	Aris Thessaloniki (Greece)	2 – 0	(Norway) Rosenborg	Thessaloniki
20:00	Danijel Cesarec 45+1'; Ricardo Faty 90+2'	Report		Stadium: Kleanthis Vikelidis Stadium; Attendance: 17,283; Referee: Thomas Einwaller (Austria)

==== Knockout phase ====
===== Round of 32 =====
15 February 2011 First leg	Aris Thessaloniki (Greece)	0 – 0	(England) Manchester City	Thessaloniki
19:00		Report		Stadium: Kleanthis Vikelidis Stadium; Attendance: 18,812; Referee: Alberto Undiano Mallenco (Spain)

24 February 2011 Second leg	Manchester City (England)	3 – 0 (3–0 agg.)	(Greece) Aris Thessaloniki	Manchester
22:05	Edin Džeko 7', 12'; Yaya Touré 75'	Report		Stadium: City of Manchester Stadium; Attendance: 36,748; Referee: Pavel Královec (Czech Republic)

== Squad statistics ==
=== Appearances ===
As of match played 10 April 2011

#	Position	Nat.	Player	Super League		Greek Cup		UEL		Total	
#	Position	Nat.	Player	Apps	Starts	Apps	Starts	Apps	Starts	Apps	Starts
1	GK	(Greece)	Markos Vellidis	4	4	0	0	0	0	4	4
2	DF	(Brazil)	Darcy Dolce Neto	25	25	1	0	6	6	32	31
3	DF	(Spain)	Oriol Lozano	8	8	0	0	2	2	10	10
4	DF	(Greece)	Efthymis Kouloucheris	7	7	0	0	2	1	9	8
5	DF	(Brazil) / (Portugal)	Ronaldo Guiaro	16	16	1	1	10	10	27	27
8	MF	(Colombia)	Juan Carlos Toja	24	20	1	0	11	10	36	30
9	FW	(Croatia)	Danijel Cesarec	23	15	0	0	8	5	31	20
12	MF	(Greece)	Giorgos Katidis	3	1	0	0	0	0	3	1
13	GK	(Greece)	Michalis Sifakis	22	22	1	1	12	12	35	35
14	MF	(Senegal) / (France)	Ricardo Faty	21	15	0	0	8	7	29	22
16	DF	(Brazil) / (Portugal)	Michel Pereira	25	25	1	1	12	12	38	38
17	MF	(Greece)	Konstantinos Kaznaferis	11	4	0	0	6	0	17	4
18	MF	(Spain)	Cristian Portilla	10	6	0	0	0	0	10	6
19	MF	(Greece)	Kostas Mendrinos	20	11	0	0	6	3	26	14
21	DF	(Greece)	Grigoris Papazaharias	3	2	0	0	3	2	3	2
22	FW	(Argentina)	Raúl Bobadilla	7	7	0	0	2	2	9	9
23	FW	(Spain)	Christos Aravidis	4	1	0	0	0	0	4	1
24	DF	(Greece)	Nikos Lazaridis	28	28	1	1	11	11	40	40
25	GK	(Spain)	Juanma Barrero	5	4	0	0	0	0	5	4
26	MF	(Portugal) / (Guinea)	Danilo Pereira	5	4	0	0	0	0	5	4
27	DF	(Greece)	Charalampos Oikonomopoulos	1	0	0	0	0	0	1	0
29	DF	(Greece)	Giannis Agtzidis	0	0	0	0	0	0	0	0
32	DF	(Albania)	Kristi Vangjeli	22	22	1	1	8	8	31	31
33	DF	(Lithuania)	Deividas Česnauskis	9	2	0	0	6	1	15	3
47	MF	(Greece)	Mavroudis Bougaidis	0	0	0	0	0	0	0	0
55	MF	(Greece)	Sakis Prittas	15	13	1	1	11	5	27	19
77	FW	(Mexico) / (Uruguay)	Nery Castillo	10	5	0	0	1	0	11	5
88	FW	(Japan)	Daisuke Sakata	6	3	0	0	2	2	8	5
Players who left the club during this season
	FW	(Spain)	Javito Peral	19	16	1	1	10	10	30	27
	FW	(Spain)	Álvaro Portilla	3	0	0	0	0	0	3	0
	MF	(Tunisia) / (France)	Mehdi Nafti	10	9	1	1	4	4	15	14
	FW	(Guatemala)	Carlos Ruiz	16	11	1	1	8	5	25	17
	FW	(Brazil)	Fabiano de Lima	3	0	0	0	0	0	3	0
	FW	(Spain)	Sergio Koke	20	17	1	1	11	10	32	28
Total				30		1		14		43	

=== Goals ===
As of match played 10 April 2011

Ranking	Position	Nat.	Player	Super League	Greek Cup	UEL	Total
1	DF	(Brazil)	Darcy Dolce Neto	8	0	0	8
2	DF	(Greece)	Nikos Lazaridis	4	0	1	5
2	FW	(Croatia)	Danijel Cesarec	2	0	3	5
4	FW	(Spain)	Sergio Koke	2	0	2	4
4	FW	(Guatemala)	Carlos Ruiz	1	0	3	4
6	FW	(Spain)	Javito Peral	2	0	1	3
7	FW	(Argentina)	Raúl Bobadilla	2	0	0	2
7	DF	(Portugal) / (Guinea-Bissau)	Danilo Pereira	2	0	0	2
7	FW	(Mexico) / (Uruguay)	Nery Castillo	2	0	0	2
7	MF	(Senegal) / (France)	Ricardo Faty	1	0	1	2
7	FW	(Spain)	Toni Calvo	0	0	2	2
12	DF	(Spain)	Oriol Lozano	1	0	0	1
12	FW	(Spain)	Álvaro Portilla	1	0	0	1
12	MF	(Spain)	Cristian Portilla	1	0	0	1
12	DF	(Brazil) / (Portugal)	Ronaldo Guiaro	0	1	0	1
Own Goals				0	0	0	0
Total				29	1	13	43

=== Clean sheets ===
If a goalkeeper was substituted and he did not conceded a goal while he was in the game but the team conceded a goal after him, the goalkeeper would not claim the clean sheet.

As of match played 10 April 2011

#	Nat.	Player	Super League 1	Greek Cup	UEL	Total
13	(Greece)	Michalis Sifakis	8	0	5	13
1	(Greece)	Markos Vellidis	1	0	0	1
23	(Spain)	Juanma Barrero	1	0	0	1
Total			10	0	5	15

== Kit ==
Supplier: Under Armour
Sponsor(s): good.gr

Home; Colours	Away; Colours	Third; Colours	Goalkeeper's Home Colours	Goalkeeper's Away Colours

Source: arisfc.gr
