= Danilo Pereira =

Footballer (born 1991)

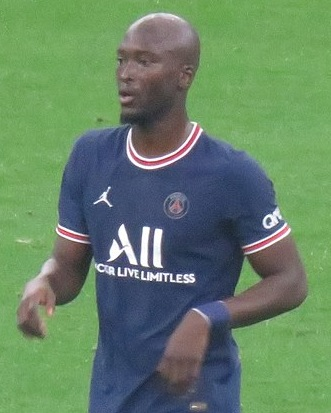
- Pereira with Paris Saint-Germain in 2021

Personal information
- Full name: Danilo Luís Hélio Pereira
- Date of birth: 9 September 1991 (age 35)
- Place of birth: Bissau, Guinea-Bissau
- Height: 1.88 m (6 ft 2 in)
- Positions: Centre-back; defensive midfielder

Team information
- Current team: Al-Ittihad
- Number: 2

Youth career
- 1999–2005: Arsenal 72
- 2005–2008: Estoril
- 2008–2010: Benfica

Senior career*
Years	Team	Apps	(Gls)
2010–2013	Parma	5	(0)
2011	→ Aris (loan)	5	(2)
2012–2013	→ Roda (loan)	31	(1)
2013–2015	Marítimo	57	(4)
2015–2021	Porto	135	(15)
2020–2021	→ Paris Saint-Germain (loan)	23	(2)
2021–2024	Paris Saint-Germain	86	(7)
2024–	Al-Ittihad	67	(4)

International career
2009	Portugal U18	5	(1)
2009–2010	Portugal U19	17	(0)
2010–2011	Portugal U20	19	(3)
2012	Portugal U21	3	(0)
2015–2024	Portugal	74	(2)
Medal record
Men's football
Representing Portugal
UEFA European Championship
Winner	2016 France
UEFA Nations League
Winner	2019 Portugal
FIFA Confederations Cup
Third place	2017 Russia
FIFA U-20 World Cup
Runner-up	2011 Colombia
- * Club domestic league appearances and goals as of 16:03, 30 October 2026 (UTC)

Danilo Luís Hélio Pereira CvIH ComM (Portuguese pronunciation: [dɐˈnilu pɨˈɾɐjɾɐ]; born 9 September 1991), sometimes known as simply Danilo, is a professional footballer who plays as a centre-back or defensive midfielder for and captains Saudi Pro League club Al-Ittihad.

He came through Benfica's youth academy, signing with Italian Serie A side Parma in 2010. He was consecutively loaned to various clubs, before transferring to Marítimo in 2013. In July 2015, he joined Porto for a reported fee of €4.5 million, winning two Primeira Liga titles and one Taça de Portugal while being part of the squad that won a domestic double in 2020, making 202 official appearances for them. In October 2020, he moved to Paris Saint-Germain on an initial one-year loan deal, which was made permanent at the end of the season.

Born in Guinea-Bissau, Pereira represented Portugal at under-18, under-19, under-20 and under-21 levels, reaching the final of the 2011 FIFA U-20 World Cup. He made his senior international debut in 2015, and was part of the squads that won UEFA Euro 2016 and the 2019 UEFA Nations League Finals on home soil.

== Club career ==
=== Early career ===
Born in Bissau, Guinea-Bissau as the oldest child of Quinta Djata, a nurse, Pereira and his family moved to Portugal when he was five. He played his youth football with three clubs in the Lisbon area, finishing his development with Benfica.

Benfica subsequently decided against signing Pereira to a professional contract, and Italian side Parma acquired him on a free transfer. He spent the second half of the 2010–11 season on loan to Aris in Greece and, upon his return to the Stadio Ennio Tardini, made his first appearance in Serie A on 21 December 2011, coming on as a late substitute in a 3–3 home draw against Catania.

Pereira was loaned again for 2012–13, spending the campaign with Roda in the Eredivisie and being first choice to help his team narrowly avoid relegation.

=== Marítimo ===
On 1 August 2013, Pereira returned to Portugal, signing with Marítimo. He made his Primeira Liga debut 17 days later in a 2–1 home victory over his former club Benfica, and scored his first goal on 19 December in the 2–2 home draw with Braga. He made 32 competitive appearances during the season, helping his team to a sixth-place finish to narrowly miss out on qualification for the UEFA Europa League.

Pereira played his last match for the Madeirans on 29 May 2015 in the final of the Taça da Liga, lost 2–1 against Benfica.

=== Porto ===
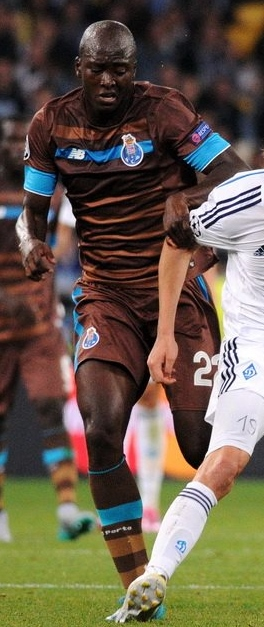
Pereira playing for Porto in 2015

On 2 July 2015, Pereira agreed to a four-year contract with Porto for a transfer fee of €4.5 million, the highest sale in Marítimo's history, with a buyout clause of €40 million. He scored a career-best six goals – from 33 appearances – in his first year, in a runner-up finish. In October 2016, he was named Porto's footballer of the year after winning the "Dragão de Ouro" award.

Pereira was elected the Primeira Liga's midfielder of the month in September 2017, a feat he replicated in December. He suffered a calf injury during a League Cup game at Sporting CP on 24 January 2018, going on to be sidelined for several months.

In the final of the Taça de Portugal, on 25 May 2019 against Sporting, following a 2–2 draw after extra time and despite Pereira converting his attempt, Porto lost the penalty shootout 5–4. After the departure of Héctor Herrera for Atlético Madrid, he became the captain. His team won the league title that season, and he opened the scoring in the 2–0 home win over Sporting that sealed the crown on 15 July 2020.

=== Paris Saint-Germain ===
On 5 October 2020, Pereira joined Paris Saint-Germain on a one-year loan for a reported fee of €4 million with a conditional obligation to buy at the end of the season for €16 million. He made his debut 15 days later, in a 2–1 home loss against Manchester United in the group stage of the UEFA Champions League. His Ligue 1 bow was also that month, in the 4–0 rout of Dijon also at the Parc des Princes, where he featured as a central defender. His first goal came in the reverse fixture against the latter adversary on 27 February 2021, when he headed in a cross from a corner (same score).

PSG eventually finished second to Lille in the league. This triggered the obligation to make the move permanent, and Pereira therefore became linked to the club until 2025. On 6 February 2022, he scored a brace for the first time in his career to help his team to a 5–1 away win over Lille, and won his first league title that campaign contributing five goals.

On 22 August 2023, Pereira was elected vice-captain by his teammates.

=== Al-Ittihad ===
Having fallen out of favour in PSG and having not featured in any of Luis Enrique's matchday squads for the new season, on 2 September 2024 Pereira was signed by Saudi Pro League club Al-Ittihad for a reported fee of €5 million. He claimed the double in his first season, scoring two of his four goals in the semi-finals of the King's Cup to help the hosts come from behind 2–1 in injury time and defeat Al Shabab 3–2.

== International career ==
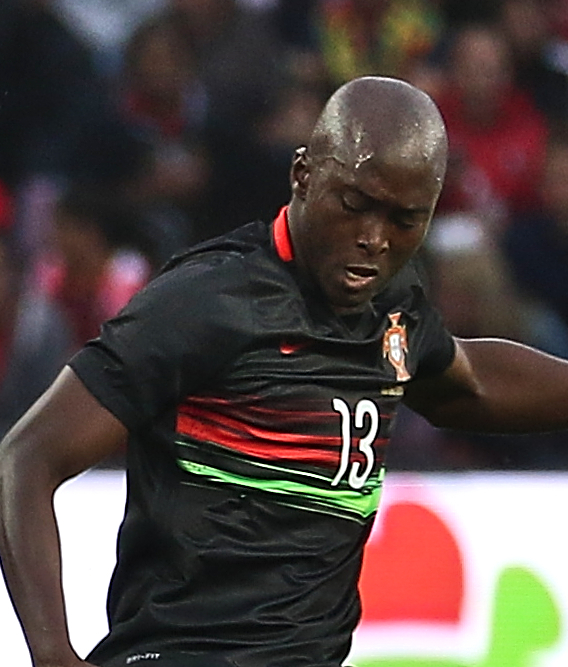
Pereira with Portugal in 2015

Pereira chose to represent Portugal internationally. He was part of the under-20 side that finished second at the 2011 FIFA U-20 World Cup in Colombia, playing all seven games (six complete) and scoring in the 2–0 semi-final win over France.

Pereira made his senior international debut on 31 March 2015, replacing fellow debutant Bernardo Silva after 62 minutes of an eventual 0–2 friendly defeat to Cape Verde in Estoril. He was also selected for the UEFA Euro 2016 squad by manager Fernando Santos, scoring his first goal in the last warm-up game, a 7–0 victory against Estonia in Lisbon on 8 June. He made five appearances for the champions in the finals in France.

Having missed the 2018 FIFA World Cup due to injury, Pereira was earlier picked for the 2017 FIFA Confederations Cup and later Euro 2020 and the 2022 World Cup. In the latter tournament, he fractured a rib in the first group fixture against Ghana, taking part in no further games.

== Career statistics ==
=== Club ===
As of match played 20 October 2026

Appearances and goals by club, season and competition
Club	Season	League			National cup (Note: Includes KNVB Cup, Taça de Portugal, Coupe de France, King's Cup)		League cup (Note: Includes Taça da Liga)		Continental		Other		Total	
Club	Season	Division	Apps	Goals	Apps	Goals	Apps	Goals	Apps	Goals	Apps	Goals	Apps	Goals
Parma	2010–11	Serie A	0	0	0	0	—		—		—		0	0
Parma	2011–12	Serie A	5	0	0	0	—		—		—		5	0
Parma	Total		5	0	0	0	—		—		—		5	0
Aris (loan)	2010–11	Super League Greece	5	2	—		—		—		—		5	2
Roda (loan)	2012–13	Eredivisie	31	1	1	0	—		—		4 (Note: Appearances in Eredivisie relegation play-offs)	0	36	1
Marítimo	2013–14	Primeira Liga	28	1	2	0	2	0	—		—		32	1
Marítimo	2014–15	Primeira Liga	29	3	4	0	5	0	—		—		38	3
Marítimo	Total		57	4	6	0	7	0	—		—		70	4
Porto	2015–16	Primeira Liga	33	6	5	0	0	0	7 (Note: Six appearances in UEFA Champions League, one appearance in UEFA Europa League)	0	—		45	6
Porto	2016–17	Primeira Liga	28	4	2	0	1	0	10 (Note: Appearances in UEFA Champions League)	0	—		41	4
Porto	2017–18	Primeira Liga	19	1	3	2	2	0	6	1	—		30	4
Porto	2018–19	Primeira Liga	26	2	4	1	3	0	10	0	0	0	43	3
Porto	2019–20	Primeira Liga	26	2	3	0	2	0	9 (Note: Two appearances in UEFA Champions League, seven appearances in UEFA Europa League)	0	—		40	2
Porto	2020–21	Primeira Liga	3	0	0	0	0	0	0	0	—		3	0
Porto	Total		135	15	17	3	8	0	42	1	0	0	202	19
Paris Saint-Germain (loan)	2020–21	Ligue 1	23	2	6	0	—		12	0	1 (Note: Appearance in Trophée des Champions)	0	42	2
Paris Saint-Germain	2021–22	Ligue 1	27	5	2	0	—		7	0	1	0	37	5
Paris Saint-Germain	2022–23	Ligue 1	33	2	3	0	—		7	0	1	0	44	2
Paris Saint-Germain	2023–24	Ligue 1	26	0	5	1	—		4	0	0	0	35	1
Paris Saint-Germain	PSG total		109	9	16	1	—		30	0	3	0	158	10
Al-Ittihad	2024–25	Saudi Pro League	26	2	3	2	—		—		—		29	4
Al-Ittihad	2025–26	Saudi Pro League	31	2	3	0	—		9 (Note: Appearances in AFC Champions League Elite)	1	1 (Note: Appearance in Saudi Super Cup)	0	44	3
Al-Ittihad	2026–27	Saudi Pro League	8	0	1	1	—		3	0	—		12	1
Al-Ittihad	Total		65	4	7	3	—		12	1	1	0	85	8
Career total			407	35	47	7	15	0	84	2	8	0	561	44

=== International ===
Appearances and goals by national team and year
National team	Year	Apps	Goals
Portugal	2015	7	0
Portugal	2016	10	1
Portugal	2017	10	0
Portugal	2018	4	0
Portugal	2019	6	1
Portugal	2020	7	0
Portugal	2021	11	0
Portugal	2022	9	0
Portugal	2023	6	0
Portugal	2024	4	0
Total		74	2

Score and results list Portugal's score first, score column indicates score after each Pereira goal.

List of international goals scored by Danilo Pereira
No.	Date	Venue	Cap	Opponent	Score	Result	Competition
1	8 June 2016	Estádio da Luz, Lisbon, Portugal	12	Estonia	4–0	7–0	Friendly
2	25 March 2019	Estádio da Luz, Lisbon, Portugal	32	Serbia	1–1	1–1	UEFA Euro 2020 qualifying

== Honours ==
Porto

- Primeira Liga: 2017–18, 2019–20
- Taça de Portugal: 2019–20

Paris Saint-Germain

- Ligue 1: 2021–22, 2022–23, 2023–24
- Coupe de France: 2020–21, 2023–24
- Trophée des Champions: 2020, 2022, 2023

Al-Ittihad

- Saudi Pro League: 2024–25
- King's Cup: 2024–25

Portugal U20

- FIFA U-20 World Cup runner-up: 2011

Portugal

- UEFA European Championship: 2016
- UEFA Nations League: 2018–19
- FIFA Confederations Cup third place: 2017

Individual

- SJPF Primeira Liga Team of the Year: 2016, 2017
- FC Porto Player of the Year – Dragão de Ouro Award: 2016

Orders

- Knight of the Order of Prince Henry
- Commander of the Order of Merit
