= 2007–08 Racing de Santander season =

Racing de Santander
2007–08 season
- Manager: Marcelino
- Stadium: El Sardinero
- La Liga: 6th
- Copa del Rey: Semi-finals
- Top goalscorer: Mohamed Tchité (8)

During the 2007–08 Spanish football season, Racing de Santander competed in La Liga.

== Season summary ==
Santander enjoyed the club's best season since 1934, finishing in sixth place and qualifying for the UEFA Cup for the first time in their history.

== First-team squad ==
Squad at end of season

Note: Flags indicate national team as defined under FIFA eligibility rules; some limited exceptions apply. Players may hold more than one non-FIFA nationality.

No.	Pos.	Nation	Player
1	GK	(Switzerland) SUI	Fabio Coltorti
2	DF	(Uruguay) URU	Sergio Órteman
3	DF	(Spain) ESP	Oriol
4	DF	(Argentina) ARG	Ezequiel Garay
5	MF	(Spain) ESP	Pablo Álvarez
6	MF	(Argentina) ARG	Aldo Duscher
7	MF	(Spain) ESP	Jorge López
8	MF	(Spain) ESP	Gonzalo Colsa
9	FW	(Burundi) BDI	Mohammed Tchité
10	FW	(Spain) ESP	Pedro Munitis
11	MF	(Spain) ESP	Óscar Serrano
12	FW	(Poland) POL	Ebi Smolarek
13	GK	(Spain) ESP	Toño
14	DF	(Spain) ESP	Pablo Pinillos
15	FW	(Argentina) ARG	Brian Sarmiento
16	DF	(Spain) ESP	Sergio Sánchez

No.	Pos.	Nation	Player
17	DF	(Spain) ESP	Luis Fernández
18	MF	(Spain) ESP	Jordi López (on loan from Mallorca)
19	MF	(Peru) PER	Damián Ísmodes
21	DF	(Spain) ESP	Ayoze
22	DF	(Spain) ESP	José Moratón
23	MF	(Spain) ESP	Jonatan Valle
24	DF	(Spain) ESP	César Navas
25	GK	(Spain) ESP	Juan Catalayud
26	MF	(Spain) ESP	Luisma Villa
27	DF	(Spain) ESP	Aitor
28	MF	(Spain) ESP	Edu Bedia
29	DF	(Spain) ESP	Iván Marcano
30	GK	(Spain) ESP	Ángel Díaz
31	GK	(Spain) ESP	Mario Fernández
32	FW	(Spain) ESP	Iván Bolado

=== Left club during season ===
Note: Flags indicate national team as defined under FIFA eligibility rules; some limited exceptions apply. Players may hold more than one non-FIFA nationality.

No.	Pos.	Nation	Player
2	DF	(Spain) ESP	Samuel (on loan to Las Palmas)
5	DF	(Spain) ESP	Christian (on loan to Las Palmas)
9	FW	(Spain) ESP	David Aganzo (to Deportivo Alavés)
19	MF	(Spain) ESP	Cristian Portilla (on loan to Racing Ferrol)

No.	Pos.	Nation	Player
20	MF	(United States) USA	Danny Szetela (on loan to Brescia)
28	MF	(Spain) ESP	Mario Ortíz (demoted to Racing de Santander B)
30	DF	(Brazil) BRA	Fernando Abreu (to Atlético Madrid B)

== Transfers ==
=== In ===
- (Poland) Ebi Smolarek - (Germany) Borussia Dortmund, 24 August, €4,800,000
- (Switzerland) Fabio Coltorti - (Switzerland) Grasshoppers, 31 August, €1,000,000
- (Argentina) Aldo Duscher - (Spain) Deportivo, July, free
- (Argentina) Brian Sarmiento - (Argentina) Estudiantes, July
- (Spain) Jorge López - (Spain) Valencia, free

== Competitions ==
=== La Liga ===
==== League table ====
Pos	Team	Pld	W	D	L	GF	GA	GD	Pts	Qualification or relegation
4	Atlético Madrid	38	19	7	12	66	47	+19	64 (Note: ATM 4–3 SEV; SEV 1–2 ATM)	Qualification for the Champions League third qualifying round
5	Sevilla	38	20	4	14	75	49	+26	64	Qualification for the UEFA Cup first round
6	Racing Santander	38	17	9	12	42	41	+1	60	Qualification for the UEFA Cup first round
7	Mallorca	38	15	14	9	69	54	+15	59	
8	Almería	38	14	10	14	42	45	−3	52 (Note: DEP 0–3 ALM; ALM 1–0 DEP)	

Source: LFP
Rules for classification: 1st points; 2nd head-to-head points; 3rd head-to-head goal difference; 4th head-to-head goals scored; 5th goal difference; 6th number of goals scored; 7th Fair-play points

==== Results by round ====
Round	1	2	3	4	5	6	7	8	9	10	11	12	13	14	15	16	17	18	19	20	21	22	23	24	25	26	27	28	29	30	31	32	33	34	35	36	37	38
Ground	H	A	H	A	H	A	H	A	H	A	H	A	H	A	H	A	A	H	A	A	H	A	H	A	H	A	H	A	H	A	H	A	H	A	H	H	A	H
Result	D	D	W	L	L	W	W	D	W	D	D	W	W	L	W	L	L	W	W	L	D	D	L	D	W	W	W	D	W	W	L	W	L	L	W	L	D	W
Position	13	13	7	14	17	11	9	8	8	9	8	7	7	7	6	6	6	6	6	6	6	6	6	8	7	6	5	7	5	5	5	5	5	5	5	6	6	6

Updated to match(es) played on 18 May 2008. Source: Scoreboard
A = Away; H = Home; W = Win; D = Draw; L = Loss

=== Copa del Rey ===
28 February Semi-finals first leg	Getafe	3–1	Racing de Santander	Coliseum Alfonso Pérez, Madrid
	De la Red 25'; Casquero 57'; Manu 83'		Smolarek 28'

19 March Semi-finals second leg	Racing de Santander	1–1	Getafe	Estadio El Sardinero, Santander
	Munitis 7'		Casquero 80'
