= Víctor Curto =

Spanish footballer

Personal information
- Full name: Víctor Curto Ortiz
- Date of birth: 17 June 1982 (age 44)
- Place of birth: Tortosa, Spain
- Height: 1.76 m (5 ft 9 1/2 in)
- Position: Forward

Youth career
- Tortosa
- Barcelona

Senior career*
Years	Team	Apps	(Gls)
1998–1999	Tortosa	16	(6)
1999–2003	Barcelona C	128	(44)
2001–2003	Barcelona B	2	(1)
2003–2004	Valencia C		
2004	Valencia B	4	(0)
2004–2005	Huesca	17	(1)
2005–2006	Sant Andreu	46	(14)
2006–2007	Reus	36	(16)
2007–2008	Gavà	16	(0)
2008–2009	Terrassa	33	(9)
2009–2010	Alcoyano	38	(20)
2010–2011	Girona	6	(0)
2011–2013	Albacete	68	(20)
2013–2014	Jaén	36	(6)
2014–2016	Eupen	49	(26)
2016	Albacete	15	(2)
2016–2017	Linares	17	(10)
2017–2021	Murcia	76	(23)
2021–2022	Quintanar Rey	29	(6)
Total		632	(204)
- * Club domestic league appearances and goals

Víctor Curto Ortiz (born 17 June 1982) is a Spanish former professional footballer who played as a forward.

He recorded figures of 57 matches and eight goals in the Segunda División for Girona, Jaén and Albacete, but spent most of his career in the Segunda División B, exceeding 280 games and 80 goals in service of ten teams.

== Club career ==
Born in Tortosa, Tarragona, Catalonia, Curto began his career at hometown's CD Tortosa before joining the ranks of FC Barcelona where he played mainly in the C team, scoring on his first of just two appearances with the reserves, a 2–3 Segunda División B home loss to Novelda CF on 6 May 2001. After a similar spell at Valencia CF, he became a journeyman with one-year stints at SD Huesca, UE Sant Andreu, CF Reus Deportiu, CF Gavà, Terrassa FC and CD Alcoyano, never higher than the third division.

On 7 July 2010, Curto signed for Girona FC, his first professional club, making six appearances – one start – over one season in the Segunda División. He subsequently dropped down a level to play and score more regularly at Albacete Balompié. In July 2013, he joined Real Jaén ahead of their first campaign in the second tier for 11 years, contributing six goals from 40 competitive matches as they descended again.

Curto moved abroad for the first time on 30 July 2014, signing along with several compatriots at Belgian Second Division side K.A.S. Eupen. In his two years there he netted 27 goals in 56 games, including a hat-trick on 7 October 2015 in a 6–0 home win over K. Patro Eisden Maasmechelen. While the team won promotion in his second season, he left halfway through to return to Albacete, who ended up relegated back to the third division.

On 31 August 2016, Curto agreed to a one-year deal at Linares Deportivo. After taking leave for depression, he switched to fellow third-tier side Real Murcia CF the following January for a fee of €35,000.

Aged 35, Curto was crowned top scorer in the 2017–18 edition of the Copa del Rey, scoring six goals to help his team reach the round of 32 where they fell to his previous club Barcelona. He did not take part in that tie, however, having suffered a cruciate ligament injury shortly before.
