= Cristian Portilla =

Spanish footballer

Personal information
- Full name: Cristian Portilla Rodríguez
- Date of birth: 28 August 1988 (age 38)
- Place of birth: Santander, Spain
- Height: 1.80 m (5 ft 11 in)
- Position: Attacking midfielder

Youth career
- 1997–2004: Racing Santander

Senior career*
Years	Team	Apps	(Gls)
2004–2007	Racing B	54	(7)
2005–2009	Racing Santander	4	(0)
2008	→ Racing Ferrol (loan)	15	(0)
2008–2009	→ Ponferradina (loan)	32	(4)
2009–2010	Sporting Gijón B	22	(6)
2010	Sporting Gijón	5	(0)
2011–2012	Aris	11	(1)
2012–2013	Atlético Baleares	16	(0)
2013	Glyfada	10	(1)
2014	Honvéd	9	(1)
2015	Mitra Kukar	0	(0)
2015	Ermis	1	(0)
2015–2016	Tatabánya	17	(4)
2016	Mensajero	19	(1)
2017	San Francisco Deltas	17	(2)
2018	Ottawa Fury	28	(2)
2019	Žalgiris	0	(0)
2019–2020	Unionistas	25	(2)
2020–2022	Tropezón	27	(6)
Total		312	(37)

International career
2004	Spain U16	4	(1)
2006	Spain U17	5	(0)
- * Club domestic league appearances and goals

Cristian Portilla Rodríguez (born 28 August 1988) is a Spanish former professional footballer who played as an attacking midfielder.

== Club career ==
Portilla was born in Santander, Cantabria. The son of a former footballer, he entered local Racing de Santander's youth academy at nine after allegedly receiving an offer from Deportivo de La Coruña after a tournament, which his father turned down.

After playing with the reserves, Portilla first appeared with the professionals on 27 October 2005 during a 1–1 away draw against Real Zaragoza, playing two more La Liga games during the season. In his first years he could only add another appearance with the main squad and, in January 2008, was loaned to Racing de Ferrol who were finally relegated from the second division.

To further continue his development as a player (still aged 20), Portilla was loaned again the following campaign, moving to SD Ponferradina in the third level. For 2009–10 he was bought by Sporting de Gijón of the top flight, with Santander having an option to re-acquire the player in three years; in his first, he spent time with both the first and second teams, the latter in division three.

In late December 2010, Portilla left Asturias and joined Super League Greece club Aris Thessaloniki FC, signing a two-and-a-half-year contract. He left one year later, due to unpaid wages.

Portilla did not settle with any team the following years, representing CD Atlético Baleares, Glyfada FC, Budapest Honvéd FC, Mitra Kukar FC, Ermis Aradippou FC, FC Tatabánya and CD Mensajero. On 17 January 2017, he moved to the North American Soccer League with the San Francisco Deltas, winning the Soccer Bowl in his first season even though he did not appear in the decisive match against the New York Cosmos due to injury.

On 8 February 2018, Portilla signed with Ottawa Fury FC of the United Soccer League following a two-week pre-season trial, joining former Deltas teammates Nana Attakora and Maxim Tissot. Eleven months later, he joined Lithuanian A Lyga runners-up FK Žalgiris.

== Career statistics ==
As of match played 22 August 2015

Club statistics
Club	Season	League			Cups		Other		Total	
Club	Season	Division	Apps	Goals	Apps	Goals	Apps	Goals	Apps	Goals
Racing Santander	2005–06	La Liga	3	0	0	0	—		3	0
Racing Santander	2006–07	La Liga	1	0	0	0	—		1	0
Racing Santander	2007–08	La Liga	0	0	0	0	—		0	0
Racing Santander	Racing Santander total		4	0	0	0	—		4	0
Racing Ferrol (loan)	2007–08	Segunda División	15	0	—		—		15	0
Ponferradina (loan)	2008–09	Segunda División B	32	4	4	3	0	0	36	7
Sporting Gijón	2009–10	La Liga	4	0	0	0	—		4	0
Sporting Gijón	2010–11	La Liga	1	0	1	0	—		2	0
Sporting Gijón	Sporting Gijón total		5	0	1	0	—		6	0
Aris	2010–11	Super League Greece	10	1	0	0	—		10	1
Aris	2011–12	Super League Greece	1	0	0	0	—		1	0
Aris	Aris total		11	1	0	0	—		11	1
Atlético Baleares	2012–13	Segunda División B	16	0	0	0	—		16	0
Glyfada	2013–14	Football League	10	1	1	0	—		11	1
Honvéd	2014–15	Nemzeti Bajnokság I	9	1	5	0	—		14	1
Ermis	2015–16	Cypriot First Division	1	0	0	0	—		1	0
Career total			103	7	11	3	—		114	10
