= Fabio Coltorti =

Swiss footballer (born 1980)

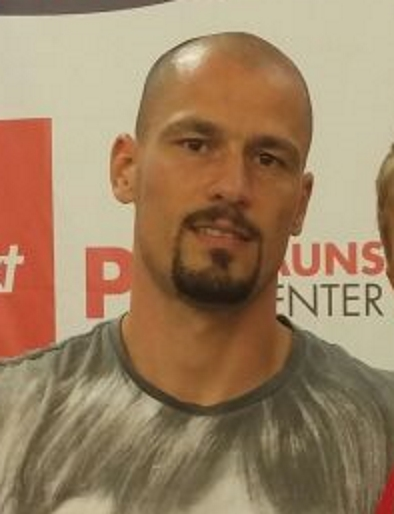
- Coltorti in 2015

Personal information
- Full name: Fabio Coltorti
- Date of birth: 3 December 1980 (age 45)
- Place of birth: Kriens, Switzerland
- Height: 1.97 m (6 ft 5 1/2 in)
- Position: Goalkeeper

Youth career
- 1987–1999: Kriens

Senior career*
Years	Team	Apps	(Gls)
1999–2001	Kriens	12	(0)
2001–2003	Schaffhausen	61	(0)
2003–2005	Thun	58	(0)
2005–2007	Grasshoppers	77	(0)
2007–2011	Racing Santander	36	(0)
2011–2012	Lausanne-Sport	24	(0)
2012–2018	RB Leipzig	92	(1)
Total		360	(1)

International career
2006–2007	Switzerland	8	(0)
- * Club domestic league appearances and goals

Fabio Coltorti (born 3 December 1980) is a Swiss former professional footballer who played as a goalkeeper.

== Club career ==
Coltorti was born in Kriens. During his career in his country, he played with SC Kriens, FC Schaffhausen, FC Thun and Grasshopper Club Zürich, being first choice for the latter three sides.

On 30 August 2007, Coltorti penned a four-year contract with Spanish club Racing de Santander, for €1 million. During his first season with the Cantabrians he was mainly restricted to Copa del Rey matches, which also happened in the following; his La Liga debut came on 22 December 2007, in a 1–4 away loss against Sevilla FC.

From mid-December 2009 to February 2010, Coltorti had his longest league run in Racing's goal, benefitting from starter Toño's injury. In the first eight matches the team only lost once, at Villarreal CF (2–0), conceding just seven goals. He would finish the campaign with 23 league appearances, as they barely avoided relegation after finishing in 16th position.

Toño returned to full fitness for 2010–11, playing 37 of 38 league games. In mid-June 2011, Coltorti returned to his country and signed a one-year deal with FC Lausanne-Sport. During a league game against BSC Young Boys in early April of the following year he injured his little finger in the final minutes but, rather than leaving the pitch as his team had already used all three substitutes, he relocated his finger back into place and continued playing until the end of the 3–1 away win.

In the summer of 2012, Coltorti joined German club RB Leipzig, helping it promote from the Regionalliga Nord to the 2. Bundesliga in just two years. In late July 2014 he suffered a serious knee injury, going on to be sidelined for several months. On 24 April of the following year he became the first goalkeeper to score a winner from open play in any of the two major levels of German football, netting in the 90th minute for a 2–1 home victory over SV Darmstadt 98.

Coltorti's maiden and only appearance in the Bundesliga took place on 1 April 2017, as the 36-year-old was in goal during the 4–0 home win against Darmstadt. He announced his retirement in August 2018, with a testimonial match due to be held in his honour the following year.

== International career ==
Coltorti was called up to the 2006 FIFA World Cup despite having only one cap for the Switzerland national team, won in a friendly with Scotland on 1 March 2006. He also appeared twice for the under-21 side.

== Career statistics ==
=== Club ===
Appearances and goals by club, season and competition
Club	Season	League			National cup		Europe		Other		Total	
Club	Season	Division	Apps	Goals	Apps	Goals	Apps	Goals	Apps	Goals	Apps	Goals
Thun	2003–04	Swiss Super League	25	0	0	0	2	0	—		27	0
Thun	2004–05	Swiss Super League	33	0	4	0	6	0	—		43	0
Thun	Total		58	0	4	0	8	0	—		70	0
Grasshoppers	2005–06	Swiss Super League	35	0	2	0	8	0	—		45	0
Grasshoppers	2006–07	Swiss Super League	35	0	4	0	11	0	—		50	0
Grasshoppers	2007–08	Swiss Super League	7	0	0	0	—		—		7	0
Grasshoppers	Total		77	0	6	0	19	0	—		102	0
Racing Santander	2007–08	La Liga	7	0	7	0	—		—		14	0
Racing Santander	2008–09	La Liga	6	0	3	0	3	0	—		12	0
Racing Santander	2009–10	La Liga	23	0	4	0	—		—		27	0
Racing Santander	2010–11	La Liga	0	0	1	0	—		—		1	0
Racing Santander	Total		36	0	15	0	3	0	—		54	0
Lausanne-Sport	2011–12	Swiss Super League	24	0	0	0	—		—		24	0
RB Leipzig	2012–13	Regionalliga Nordost	28	0	—		—		—		28	0
RB Leipzig	2013–14	3. Liga	21	0	1	0	—		—		22	0
RB Leipzig	2014–15	2. Bundesliga	21	1	2	0	—		—		23	1
RB Leipzig	2015–16	2. Bundesliga	21	0	1	0	—		—		22	0
RB Leipzig	2016–17	Bundesliga	1	0	0	0	—		—		1	0
RB Leipzig	2017–18	Bundesliga	0	0	0	0	0	0	—		0	0
RB Leipzig	Total		92	1	4	0	—		—		96	1
Career total			287	1	29	0	30	0	0	0	346	1

=== International ===
Appearances and goals by national team and year
National team	Year	Apps	Goals
Switzerland	2005	0	0
Switzerland	2006	5	0
Switzerland	2007	3	0
Switzerland	2008	0	0
Total		8	0
