= Ramiro Mayor =

Spanish footballer

Personal information
- Full name: Constancio Ramiro Mayor Ruiz
- Date of birth: 9 May 1991 (age 35)
- Place of birth: Zaragoza, Spain
- Height: 1.85 m (6 ft 1 in)
- Position: Centre back

Team information
- Current team: Unionistas
- Number: 4

Youth career
- Zaragoza

Senior career*
Years	Team	Apps	(Gls)
2010–2012	Zaragoza B	51	(5)
2011–2012	Zaragoza	0	(0)
2012–2013	Villarreal B	2	(0)
2013–2014	Zamora	50	(1)
2014–2015	Valladolid B	34	(1)
2015–2016	Alcorcón	0	(0)
2015–2016	→ Guijuelo (loan)	32	(1)
2016–2017	Burgos	28	(0)
2017–2018	Logroñés	20	(0)
2019	Gimnástica Torrelavega	19	(0)
2019–2020	Langreo	22	(1)
2020–	Unionistas	156	(5)

International career
2009	Spain U18	2	(0)
2010	Spain U19	4	(0)
- * Club domestic league appearances and goals as of 9 June 2026

Constancio Ramiro Mayor Ruiz (born 9 May 1991) is a Spanish professional footballer who plays for Unionistas de Salamanca CF as a central defender.

== Club career ==
Ramiro was born in Zaragoza, Aragon. A product of Real Zaragoza's youth ranks, he made his first-team debut on 13 December 2011 in a 1–1 away draw against AD Alcorcón for the campaign's Copa del Rey. He spent the vast majority of his spell with the Aragonese with the reserve team, playing one season in Tercera División and another in Segunda División B.

On 7 July 2012, Ramiro signed with another club in the third level, Villarreal CF B. In January of the following year, he left for fellow league side Zamora CF.

On 9 July 2014, Ramiro moved to another reserve team, Real Valladolid B also in the third division. On 16 June of the following year he joined Alcorcón from Segunda División, being loaned to CD Guijuelo on 20 August.

Gimnástica Torrelavega announced on 2 January 2019, that they had signed Mayor.
