= Nikolaos Lazaridis =

Greek footballer and manager

Nikos Lazaridis
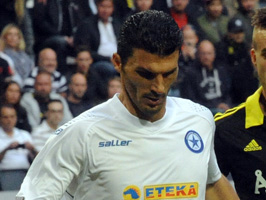

Personal information
- Full name: Nikolaos Lazaridis
- Date of birth: 12 July 1979 (age 47)
- Place of birth: Kozani, Greece
- Height: 1.82 m (5 ft 11 1/2 in)
- Position: Defender

Team information
- Current team: Atromitos (team manager)

Senior career*
Years	Team	Apps	(Gls)
2000–2003	Kozani	29	(0)
2003–2005	Kastoria	77	(10)
2005–2006	Panionios	9	(0)
2006–2010	Asteras Tripolis	115	(3)
2010–2012	Aris	52	(7)
2012–2017	Atromitos	139	(9)
Total		422	(29)
- * Club domestic league appearances and goals as of 30 April 2017

Nikolaos "Nikos" Lazaridis (Greek: Νικόλαος "Νίκος" Λαζαρίδης; born 12 July 1979) is a retired Greek football player. He is currently team manager for Atromitos.

== Club career ==
=== Kozani ===
He made his professional debut in season 2000–2001. He stayed there for three seasons playing in Greece third division championship.

=== Kastoria ===
Lazaridis played for Kastoria for two seasons in the second division championship. He was a member of the team that had stunned PAOK in Greek cup 2003–2004. In 2005, he moved to Panionios.

=== Panionios ===
For the first time he played to Greece's top level championship.

=== Asteras Tripolis ===
He moved to Asteras Tripolis in 2006 and was a basic member for the great success that Arcadia's team have made. The team within three years moved from Third division to Super League Greece. He was capped plus 100 times before he moved to Aris in the summer of 2010.

=== Aris ===
Aris is the biggest step in his career. For the first time he played to UEFA Europa League where Aris made a great impact in 2010–2011. He quickly established himself as a key member of his previous team's squad and managed to score the winning goal against Atlético Madrid, paving the path to next stage qualification for Aris. The most memorable time of the season is his goal against Atletico Madrid. Furthermore, he scored 4 goals in Super League something that made him the second scorer for Aris 2010–2011 in domestic level. He named MVP of Aris 2010–2011 season. For his passion when playing for Aris, he named captain of the team in 2011–2012 season, giving fine appearances. As captain, he scored 4 crucial goals in his second season in Aris.

=== Atromitos ===
Lazaridis' contract with Aris is expiring on 30 June 2012, but it will not be extended. The player has come to an agreement with Super League club Atromitos for an unknown length of contract. Lazaridis will be announced soon and will join the team on July,1. On 20 May 2016, the Greek centre-back has renewed his contract with the club till the summer of 2017. On 14 April 2017 he solved his contract with the club. Lazaridis had 171 appearances (11 goals) in all competitions with the club.

== Honours ==
=== Individual ===
- Super League Greece Team of the Season: 2013–14
