= Giannis Agtzidis =

Greek footballer

Personal information
- Full name: Ioannis Agtzidis
- Date of birth: 14 October 1992 (age 34)
- Place of birth: Thessaloniki, Greece
- Height: 1.81 m (5 ft 11 in)
- Position: Left-back

Youth career
- 2008–2009: Aris

Senior career*
Years	Team	Apps	(Gls)
2009–2012	Aris	0	(0)
2012–2013	Doxa Drama	8	(0)
2013–2014	AEL	0	(0)
2014	Anagennisi Giannitsa	0	(0)
2015	Vyzantio Kokkinochoma	0	(0)
2015	Episkopi	0	(0)
2016	Apollon Pontus	8	(0)
2016–2017	Kardia	0	(0)
2017	Agrotikos Asteras	0	(0)
2018	Aris Palaiochori	0	(0)
2018	PAO Koufalion	5	(1)
2019	Apollon Pontus	2	(0)

International career^{‡}
2010	Greece U19	4	(0)
- * Club domestic league appearances and goals as of 07:05, 25 June 2019 (UTC) ‡ National team caps and goals as of 07:05, 22 April 2012 (UTC)

Giannis Agtzidis (Greek: Γιάννης Αγτζίδης; born 14 October 1992) is a Greek professional footballer who plays as a left-back.

Agtzidis was promoted to the senior Aris team in 2009. Due to his manager's Manuel Machado decision to demote him to the under-20 team, he mutually terminated his contract with the club on 20 January 2012, and eight days later he signed for Doxa Drama.
