= Iván Mateo =

Spanish footballer

Personal information
- Full name: Iván Mateo Silva
- Date of birth: 4 August 1981 (age 45)
- Place of birth: Madrid, Spain
- Height: 1.80 m (5 ft 11 in)
- Position: Winger

Youth career
- Atlético Madrid

Senior career*
Years	Team	Apps	(Gls)
2000–2004	Atlético Aviación		
2004–2005	Alcalá	36	(5)
2005–2006	Hércules	1	(0)
2006	→ Cultural Leonesa (loan)	17	(6)
2006–2009	Cultural Leonesa	75	(16)
2009–2010	Badalona	19	(4)
2010–2011	Alcalá	30	(3)
2011–2012	Guijuelo	28	(3)
2012–2015	Toledo	75	(9)
2015–2017	Alcalá	52	(19)
2017	Alcobendas	17	(7)
2017–2018	Unión Adarve	28	(5)
2018–2019	Santa Ana	4	(2)
- * Club domestic league appearances and goals

Iván Mateo Silva (born 4 August 1981) is a Spanish former footballer who played as a winger.

== Club career ==
Born in Madrid, Mateo made his senior debuts with local Atlético Aviación in the 2000–01 season, in Tercera División. After four full campaigns will the club he first arrived in Segunda División B, signing with neighbouring RSD Alcalá.

In the 2005 summer Mateo joined Hércules CF in Segunda División. On 31 August he made his professional debut, starting in a 0–1 home loss against Gimnàstic de Tarragona for the campaign's Copa del Rey; his league debut came on 20 November as he played the last ten minutes of a 0–4 loss at Lorca Deportiva CF, and in January 2006 he was loaned to Cultural y Deportiva Leonesa in the third level, signing permanently in July.

Mateo continued to compete in division three but also in Tercera División in the following seasons, representing CF Badalona, Alcalá, CD Guijuelo, CD Toledo (achieving promotion to the third tier in 2013 by appearing in 32 matches and scoring three goals), Fútbol Alcobendas Sport and AD Unión Adarve.
