= Bruno Vinicius =

Brazilian footballer

Personal information
- Full name: Bruno Vinicius Simão Elesbão
- Date of birth: 16 December 2002 (age 23)
- Place of birth: Indaiatuba, Brazil
- Height: 1.86 m (6 ft 1 in)
- Position: Defensive midfielder

Team information
- Current team: Chapecoense
- Number: 22

Youth career
- 2019: Primavera
- 2020–2022: Chapecoense

Senior career*
Years	Team	Apps	(Gls)
2022–	Chapecoense	31	(0)
- * Club domestic league appearances and goals as of 21:07, 11 January 2024 (UTC)

Bruno Vinicius Simão Elesbão (born 16 December 2002), known as Bruno Vinicius, is a Brazilian footballer who plays as a defensive midfielder for Chapecoense.

== Career ==
Born in Indaiatuba, São Paulo, Bruno Vinicius joined Chapecoense's youth setup in 2020. On 7 October 2021, he renewed his contract with the club for another two years.

Bruno Vinicius made his first team debut on 30 January 2022, coming on as a late substitute for Marcelo Santos in a 2–0 Campeonato Catarinense home win over Juventus Jaraguá. He remained with Chape's under-20 squad during the rest of the year, and renewed his contract until 2025 on 17 January 2023.

After being mainly a backup option during the 2023 Catarinense, Bruno Vinicius started to feature regularly in the 2023 Série B.

== Career statistics ==
As of 11 January 2024

Club	Season	League			State League		Cup		Continental		Other		Total	
Club	Season	Division	Apps	Goals	Apps	Goals	Apps	Goals	Apps	Goals	Apps	Goals	Apps	Goals
Chapecoense	2023	Série B	0	0	1	0	0	0	—		—		1	0
Chapecoense	2023	Série B	26	0	4	0	0	0	—		—		30	0
Chapecoense	2024	Série B	0	0	0	0	0	0	—		—		0	0
Career total			26	0	5	0	0	0	0	0	0	0	31	0
