= Jesús Álvaro =

Spanish footballer

Personal information
- Full name: Jesús Álvaro García
- Date of birth: 1 December 1990 (age 35)
- Place of birth: Icod de los Vinos, Spain
- Height: 1.75 m (5 ft 9 in)
- Position: Left back

Youth career
- Tenerife

Senior career*
Years	Team	Apps	(Gls)
2009–2011	Tenerife B	53	(3)
2011–2013	Tenerife	14	(0)
2012	→ Leganés (loan)	11	(0)
2013–2014	Guadalajara	13	(0)
2014–2015	Las Palmas B	38	(1)
2015–2019	Cartagena	142	(6)
2019–2021	Córdoba	39	(1)
2021–2023	Atlético Baleares	22	(0)
- * Club domestic league appearances and goals

Jesús Álvaro García (born 1 December 1990) is a Spanish former footballer who played as a left back.

== Club career ==
Born in Icod de los Vinos, Santa Cruz de Tenerife, Canary Islands, Álvaro was a product of local CD Tenerife's youth academy. He made his senior debut in the 2009–10 season, being relegated from the third division with the reserves.

On 4 June 2011, Álvaro played his first match with the main squad, a 0–1 away defeat against UD Las Palmas in which he featured the full 90 minutes for his only second level appearance of the campaign, ended in the same fashion. In June 2011, he was definitely promoted to the first team.

In January 2012, Álvaro was loaned to CD Leganés until 30 June. After being released by Tenerife he continued to compete in the third tier, representing CD Guadalajara, UD Las Palmas Atlético, FC Cartagena and Córdoba CF.
