= Álvaro Portilla =

Spanish footballer (born 1986)

Personal information
- Full name: Álvaro Portilla Suárez
- Date of birth: 28 April 1986 (age 40)
- Place of birth: Madrid, Spain
- Height: 1.80 m (5 ft 11 in)
- Position: Midfielder

Team information
- Current team: Móstoles

Youth career
- Rayo Majadahonda
- 2004–2006: Atlético Madrid

Senior career*
Years	Team	Apps	(Gls)
2006–2008	Atlético Madrid C		
2008–2010	Atlético Madrid B	26	(2)
2010	Aris	3	(1)
2011	Rayo Majadahonda	13	(4)
2011–2012	SS Reyes	36	(5)
2012–2013	Alcalá	34	(3)
2013–2014	Internacional Madrid	29	(4)
2014–2017	Rayo Majadahonda	110	(44)
2017–2018	Fuenlabrada	14	(2)
2018	Alcobendas Sport	13	(1)
2018–2019	Unión Adarve	21	(1)
2019–	Móstoles	23	(7)
- * Club domestic league appearances and goals as of 8 March 2020

Álvaro Portilla Suárez (born 28 April 1986) is a Spanish footballer who plays for CD Móstoles URJC as a left midfielder.

== Club career ==
Portilla was born in Madrid. With the exception of a few months in the Super League Greece with Aris, he spent his entire career in the Spanish lower leagues. He finished his development at local club Atlético Madrid, but never appeared in any competitive matches with the first team.

In the 2015–16 season, Portilla scored a career-best 12 goals for CF Rayo Majadahonda, who finished 14th in their Segunda División B group.
