= 2007–08 Preston North End F.C. season =

English football club season

Preston North End
2007–08 season
- Chairman: Derek Shaw
- Manager: Paul Simpson (until 13 November); Alan Irvine (from 20 November)
- Stadium: Deepdale
- Championship: 15th
- FA Cup: Fifth round
- League Cup: First round
- Top goalscorer: League: Mellor (9); All: Mellor (10)
- Highest home attendance: 17,807 (vs Blackpool)
- Lowest home attendance: 4,616 (vs Scunthorpe United)
- Average home league attendance: 12,753

During the 2007–08 English football season, Preston North End competed in the Football League Championship.

== Season summary ==
The club went on a ten-day preseason tour of the United States' West Coast in July. They played three matches against local side Seattle Sounders, Mexican side Monterrey, and host Portland Timbers, losing all three. After losing key player David Nugent, Preston North End made a bad start to the 2007–08 season with just three victories from the opening 16 matches, which resulted in manager Paul Simpson being sacked on 13 November. Everton assistant manager Alan Irvine took over as manager seven days later and guided Preston to a 15th-place finish.

This season is also noteworthy for the introduction of Gentry Day as an annual event.

== Players ==
=== First-team squad ===
Squad at end of season

Note: Flags indicate national team as defined under FIFA eligibility rules; some limited exceptions apply. Players may hold more than one non-FIFA nationality.

No.	Pos.	Nation	Player
1	GK	ENG	Andy Lonergan
2	DF	SCO	Michael Hart
3	DF	SCO	Callum Davidson
4	MF	ENG	Richard Chaplow
5	DF	FRA	Youl Mawéné
6	MF	ENG	Jason Jarrett
7	MF	ENG	Chris Sedgwick
8	FW	ENG	Karl Hawley
9	FW	ENG	Chris Brown
10	FW	SCO	Craig Beattie (on loan from West Bromwich Albion)
11	MF	ENG	Darren Carter
12	DF	ENG	Sean St Ledger (Note: St Ledger was born in Solihull, England, but also qualified to represent the Republic of Ireland internationally through his grandfather and made his international debut for the Republic of Ireland in May 2009.)
13	GK	IRL	Wayne Henderson
14	DF	ENG	Liam Chilvers

No.	Pos.	Nation	Player
15	MF	ENG	Simon Whaley
16	MF	ENG	Paul McKenna
17	FW	ENG	Brett Ormerod
18	DF	ENG	Matt Hill
19	DF	ENG	Billy Jones
20	MF	ENG	Kevin Nicholls
21	DF	ENG	Neal Trotman
23	MF	ENG	Lewis Neal
24	MF	ENG	Joe Anyinsah
30	GK	ENG	Chris Neal
31	GK	ENG	Andrew Murphy
32	DF	IRL	Dylan Adams
33	FW	ENG	Neil Mellor
34	DF	ENG	Chris McGrail

=== Left club during season ===
Note: Flags indicate national team as defined under FIFA eligibility rules; some limited exceptions apply. Players may hold more than one non-FIFA nationality.

No.	Pos.	Nation	Player
2	DF	SCO	Graham Alexander (Note: Alexander was born in Coventry, England, but also qualified to represent Scotland internationally through his father and made his international debut for Scotland in April 2002.) (to Burnley)
2	DF	ENG	John Halls (on loan from Reading)
4	MF	ENG	Danny Pugh (to Stoke City)
9	FW	GHA	Patrick Agyemang (Note: Agyemang was born in Waltham Forest, England, but also qualified to represent Ghana internationally and made his international debut for Ghana in May 2003.) (to Queens Park Rangers)
10	FW	SCO	Paul Gallagher (on loan from Blackburn Rovers)

No.	Pos.	Nation	Player
21	FW	ENG	Andy Carroll (on loan from Newcastle United)
22	GK	POL	Grzegorz Szamotulski (released)
25	MF	ENG	Adam Nowland (to Lancaster City)
25	FW	HUN	Tamás Priskin (Note: Priskin was born in Komárno, Czechoslovakia (now Slovakia), but also qualified to represent Hungary internationally through his parents and made his international debut for Hungary in August 2005.) (on loan from Watford)

== Transfers ==
=== In ===
Date	Nation	Position	Name	Club From	Fee
12 June 2007	(England)	DF	Billy Jones	Crewe Alexandra	Free
29 June 2007	(England)	MF	Kevin Nicholls	Leeds United	Undisclosed
9 August 2007	(England)	MF	Darren Carter	West Bromwich Albion	£1,250,000
9 January 2008	(England)	MF	Richard Chaplow	West Bromwich Albion	£1,350,000
30 January 2008	(England)	DF	Neal Trotman	Oldham Athletic	£500,000
31 January 2008	(Scotland)	DF	Michael Hart	Aberdeen	£100,000
6 February 2008	(Poland)	GK	Grzegorz Szamotulski	None	Free

=== Out ===
Date	Nation	Position	Name	Club To	Fee
11 June 2007	(England)	FW	Dave Hibbert	Shrewsbury Town	Nominal
27 June 2007	(England)	GK	Carlo Nash	Wigan Athletic	£300,000
1 July 2007	(England)	MF	Warren Beattie	Free Agency	Released
1 July 2007	(England)	GK	Ben Hinchcliffe	Free Agency	Released
1 July 2007	(England)	FW	Michael Ricketts	Free Agency	Released
1 July 2007	(Czech Republic)	DF	Pavel Pergl	Free Agency	Released
1 July 2007	(England)	MF	Ashley Parillon	Free Agency	Released
1 July 2007	(The Gambia)	MF	Seyfo Soley	Free Agency	Released
11 July 2007	(England)	FW	David Nugent	Portsmouth	£6,000,000
16 July 2007	(England)	DF	Kelvin Wilson	Nottingham Forest	£300,000
31 August 2007	(Scotland)	DF	Graham Alexander	Burnley	£200,000
1 January 2008	(England)	MF	Adam Nowland	Free Agency	Released
3 January 2008	(Ghana)	FW	Patrick Agyemang	Queens Park Rangers	Undisclosed
16 January 2008	(England)	MF	Danny Pugh	Stoke City	£500,000
16 April 2008	(Poland)	GK	Grzegorz Szamotulski	Free Agency	Released

=== Loans In ===
Date	Nation	Position	Name	Club From	Length
14 August 2007	(England)	FW	Andy Caroll	Newcastle United	Six Months
31 August 2007	(Scotland)	FW	Paul Gallagher	Blackburn Rovers	Six Months
1 November 2007	(England)	DF	John Halls	Reading	One Month
4 March 2008	(Scotland)	FW	Craig Beattie	West Bromwich Albion	Until end of season
8 March 2008	(Hungary)	FW	Tamás Priskin	Watford	One Month

=== Loans Out ===
Date	Nation	Position	Name	Club To	Length
21 September 2007	(England)	MF	Adam Nowland	Gillingham	One Month
2 November 2007	(England)	MF	Danny Pugh	Stoke City	Until January
9 November 2007	(England)	MF	Adam Nowland	Stockport County	Until January

== Final league table ==
Pos	Team	Pld	W	D	L	GF	GA	GD	Pts
13	Burnley	46	16	14	16	60	67	−7	62
14	Queens Park Rangers	46	14	16	16	60	66	−6	58
15	Preston North End	46	15	11	20	50	56	−6	56
16	Sheffield Wednesday	46	14	13	19	54	55	−1	55
17	Norwich City	46	15	10	21	49	59	−10	55

Updated to match(es) played on 4 May 2008. Source: The Football League
Rules for classification: 1) points; 2) goal difference; 3) number of goals scored.

== Results ==
Preston North End's score comes first

=== Legend ===
Win	Draw	Loss

=== Preseason friendlies ===
Date	Opponent	Venue	Result	Scorers	Attendance	Ref.
23 July 2007	Seattle Sounders	A	1–2	Agyemang	3,390	
26 July 2007	Monterrey	A	0–2		9,605	
28 July 2007	Portland Timbers	A	1–2	Ormerod	8,238	

=== Football League Championship ===
Date	Opponent	Venue	Result	Attendance	Scorers
11 August 2007	Norwich City	H	0–0	13,408	
18 August 2007	West Bromwich Albion	A	0–2	19,556	
25 August 2007	Colchester United	H	0–3	11,582	
1 September 2007	Coventry City	A	1–2	17,551	Agyemang
15 September 2007	Sheffield Wednesday	H	1–0	13,062	Gallagher
18 September 2007	Scunthorpe United	A	1–2	5,754	Mawéné
22 September 2007	Cardiff City	A	2–2	11,772	Davidson (2)
29 September 2007	Bristol City	H	0–0	12,098	
2 October 2007	Southampton	H	5–1	10,279	Hawley, Carter, Sedgwick, Agyemang (2)
6 October 2007	Ipswich Town	A	1–2	19,243	Mellor (pen)
20 October 2007	Sheffield United	A	1–1	23,661	Carter
23 October 2007	Queens Park Rangers	H	0–0	11,407	
27 October 2007	Plymouth Argyle	H	2–0	11,055	Ormerod, Carter
3 November 2007	Barnsley	A	0–1	10,223	
6 November 2007	Leicester City	H	1–1	10,930	Carroll
10 November 2007	Hull City	A	0–3	16,358	
24 November 2007	Charlton Athletic	H	0–2	12,532	
27 November 2007	Crystal Palace	A	1–2	13,048	Mawéné
1 December 2007	Wolverhampton Wanderers	A	0–1	22,836	
4 December 2007	Hull City	H	3–0	11,311	Agyemang, Whaley, L Neal
8 December 2007	Blackpool	H	0–1	17,807	
15 December 2007	Burnley	A	3–2	14,829	Sedgwick, Mellor, Whaley
22 December 2007	Southampton	A	1–0	23,267	L Neal
26 December 2007	Scunthorpe United	H	0–1	12,920	
29 December 2007	Cardiff City	H	1–2	12,046	Whaley
1 January 2008	Sheffield Wednesday	A	1–2	20,690	Hawley
12 January 2008	Watford	H	1–0	12,347	Mellor
19 January 2008	Stoke City	A	1–3	15,011	Brown
29 January 2008	West Bromwich Albion	H	2–1	12,473	Mawéné, Hawley
2 February 2008	Norwich City	A	0–1	24,092	
9 February 2008	Coventry City	H	1–0	11,857	St Ledger
12 February 2008	Colchester United	A	1–2	5,122	Mellor
23 February 2008	Watford	A	0–0	16,798	
26 February 2008	Stoke City	H	2–0	12,798	Chaplow (2)
1 March 2008	Crystal Palace	H	0–1	12,347	
4 March 2008	Leicester City	A	1–0	19,264	Carter
8 March 2008	Charlton Athletic	A	2–1	25,124	Brown (2)
11 March 2008	Wolverhampton Wanderers	H	2–1	12,090	Davidson (pen), Whaley
15 March 2008	Blackpool	A	0–0	9,629	
22 March 2008	Burnley	H	2–1	16,149	Priskin, Brown
29 March 2008	Sheffield United	H	3–1	14,647	Davidson (pen), Mellor (2)
5 April 2008	Queens Park Rangers	A	2–2	14,966	Mellor, Priskin
12 April 2008	Barnsley	H	1–2	13,994	Foster (own goal)
19 April 2008	Plymouth Argyle	A	2–2	10,727	Mellor, Chaplow
26 April 2008	Ipswich Town	H	2–2	14,187	Brown, Mellor
4 May 2008	Bristol City	A	0–3	19,169	

=== FA Cup ===
Round	Date	Opponent	Venue	Result	Attendance	Goalscorers
R3	5 January 2008	Scunthorpe United	H	1–0	4,616	Whaley
R4	26 January 2008	Derby County	A	4–1	17,344	Hawley (2), Whaley, Mellor (pen)
R5	17 February 2008	Portsmouth	H	0–1	11,840	

=== League Cup ===
Round	Date	Opponent	Venue	Result	Attendance	Goalscorers
R1	14 August 2007	Morecambe	H	1–2	7,703	Pugh
