= 2008–09 Preston North End F.C. season =

English football club season

Preston North End
2008–09 season
- Chairman: Derek Shaw
- Manager: Alan Irvine
- Stadium: Deepdale
- Championship: 6th (qualified for playoffs)
- Play-offs: Semi-finals
- FA Cup: Third round
- League Cup: Second round
- Top goalscorer: League: Jon Parkin (11); All: Neil Mellor (12)
- Highest home attendance: 19,840 (vs Sheffield United)
- Lowest home attendance: 5,150 (vs Chesterfield)

During the 2008–09 English football season, Preston North End F.C. competed in the Championship.

== Season summary ==
Having spent most of the previous season embroiled in a relegation battle, this season Preston edged into the play-offs in sixth place, pipping Cardiff City on the last day of the season. Though being level with seventh-placed Cardiff with 74 points and a goal difference of +12 each, Preston gained sixth place by virtue of having scored one more goal than Cardiff over the course of the season. The run of form that had seen Preston reach the playoffs saw manager Alan Irvine named the Championship's Manager of the Month for April.

Preston were drawn against third-placed Sheffield United in the semi-finals. United won 2–1 over legs, consigning Preston to another season in the second tier of English football.

== Kit ==
For the fourth consecutive season, Preston's kits were manufactured by Italian company Diadora, who introduced new home and away kits. The home kit was a white shirt with navy shorts and navy and white hooped socks, inspired by the club's kit from the late fifties and early sixties. (White shorts were worn for the away match at Wolverhampton Wanderers on 10 January). The away kit was a yellow shirt with navy sleeves, yellow shorts and yellow socks with navy turnovers.

Lancastrian support services company Enterprise remained Preston's kit sponsors.

== Results ==
=== Legend ===
| Win | Draw | Loss |

=== Football League Championship ===
| 9 August 2008 1 | Ipswich Town | 1–2 | Preston North End | Ipswich |
| | Lisbie 2' | Report | McKenna 21' Whaley 34' | Stadium: Portman Road; Attendance: 22,307 |

| 16 August 2008 2 | Preston North End | 2–0 | Crystal Palace | Preston |
| | Nicholson 58' Chaplow 90' | Report | | Stadium: Deepdale; Attendance: 14,225 |

| 23 August 2008 3 | Sheffield Wednesday | 1–1 | Preston North End | Sheffield |
| | McAllister 20' | Report | Chaplow 77' | Stadium: Hillsborough; Attendance: 17,963 |

| 30 August 2008 4 | Preston North End | 2–1 | Charlton Athletic | Preston |
| | Mellor 58' Nicholson 66' | Report | Gray 19' (pen.) | Stadium: Deepdale; Attendance: 12,089 |

| 13 September 2008 5 | Coventry City | 0–0 | Preston North End | Coventry |
| | | Report | | Stadium: Ricoh Arena; Attendance: 16,544 |

| 16 September 2008 6 | Preston North End | 2–1 | Nottingham Forest | Preston |
| | Mawene 50' Mellor 59' | Report | Mawene (o.g.) | Stadium: Deepdale; Attendance: 13,145 |

| 20 September 2008 7 | Preston North End | 1–3 | Wolverhampton Wanderers | Preston |
| | Mellor 59' (pen.) | Report | Iwelumo 36', 66', 72' (pen.) | Stadium: Deepdale; Attendance: 17,567 |

| 27 September 2008 8 | Burnley | 3–1 | Preston North End | Burnley |
| | Guðjónsson 33' Caldwell 64' Eagles 90' | Report | Nicholson 22' | Stadium: Turf Moor; Attendance: 16,276 |

| 30 September 2008 9 | Preston North End | 0–2 | Swansea City | Preston |
| | | Report | Bodde 19' Gomez 80' (pen.) | Stadium: Deepdale; Attendance: 10,558 |

| 4 October 2008 10 | Watford | 2–1 | Preston North End | Watford |
| | Harley 12' Smith 21' | Report | St Ledger 5' | Stadium: Vicarage Road; Attendance: 14,087 |

| 18 October 2008 11 | Preston North End | 2–1 | Reading | Preston |
| | Ingimarsson (o.g.) Elliott 81' | Report | Hunt 27' (pen.) | Stadium: Deepdale; Attendance: 12,316 |

| 21 October 2008 12 | Plymouth Argyle | 1–0 | Preston North End | Plymouth |
| | Fallon 18' | Report | | Stadium: Home Park; Attendance: 9,824 |

| 25 October 2008 13 | Sheffield United | 0–1 | Preston North End | Sheffield |
| | Ehiogu 50' | Report | | Stadium: Bramall Lane; Attendance: 24,445 |

| 28 October 2008 14 | Preston North End | 2–0 | Watford | Preston |
| | Jones 43' Wallace 68' | Report | | Stadium: Deepdale; Attendance: 11,234 |

| 1 November 2008 15 | Preston North End | 2–3 | Southampton | Preston |
| | Jones 36' Elliott 42' | Report | Pearce 64' Surman 69' McGoldrick 90' | Stadium: Deepdale; Attendance: 11,508 |

| 8 November 2008 16 | Norwich City | 2–2 | Preston North End | Norwich |
| | Lita 14' Kennedy 62' | Report | Brown 2' Mellor 81' | Stadium: Carrow Road; Attendance: 23,225 |

| 16 November 2008 17 | Blackpool | 1–3 | Preston North End | Blackpool |
| | Hammill 10' | Report | Brown 55', 87' Mellor 68' | Stadium: Bloomfield Road; Attendance: 9,643 |

| 22 November 2008 18 | Preston North End | 2–1 | Barnsley | Preston |
| | Chaplow 21' St Ledger 88' | Report | Campbell-Ryce 33' | Stadium: Deepdale; Attendance: 12,153 |

| 25 November 2008 19 | Derby County | 2–2 | Preston North End | Derby |
| | Hulse 8' Stewart 32' | Report | Davidson 21' (pen.) Mellor 29' | Stadium: Pride Park; Attendance: 25,534 |

| 29 November 2008 20 | Preston North End | 2–0 | Bristol City | Preston |
| | Elliott 30' Wallace 55' | Report | | Stadium: Deepdale; Attendance: 11,161 |

| 6 December 2008 21 | Cardiff City | 2–0 | Preston North End | Cardiff |
| | Johnson 42' Chopra 76' (pen.) | Report | | Stadium: Ninian Park; Attendance: 16,560 |

| 9 December 2008 22 | Preston North End | 1–0 | Doncaster Rovers | Preston |
| | Parkin 82' | Report | | Stadium: Deepdale; Attendance: 13,152 |

| 13 December 2008 23 | Preston North End | 1–0 | Birmingham City | Preston |
| | Parkin 90' | Report | | Stadium: Deepdale; Attendance: 10,943 |

| 20 December 2008 24 | Queens Park Rangers | 3–2 | Preston North End | White City |
| | Helguson 16', 34' Blackstock 86' | Report | Sedgwick 28' Davidson 60' (pen.) | Stadium: Loftus Road; Attendance: 14,103 |

| 26 December 2008 25 | Preston North End | 2–0 | Derby County | Preston |
| | St Ledger 30' Parkin 68' | Report | | Stadium: Deepdale; Attendance: 15,197 |

| 28 December 2008 26 | Barnsley | 1–1 | Preston North End | Barnsley |
| | Cureton 16' | Report | Wallace 73' | Stadium: Oakwell; Attendance: 13,851 |

| 10 January 2009 27 | Wolverhampton Wanderers | 1–3 | Preston North End | Wolverhampton |
| | Ebanks-Blake 20' | Report | Elliott 24', 61' St Ledger 41' | Stadium: Molineux; Attendance: 26,138 |

| 17 January 2009 28 | Preston North End | 2–1 | Burnley | Preston |
| | Davidson 53' (pen.) Mellor 85' (pen.) | Report | Blake 77' | Stadium: Deepdale; Attendance: 15,692 |

| 27 January 2009 29 | Swansea City | 4–1 | Preston North End | Swansea |
| | Gomez 2' Scotland 29' Bauza 69' Tate 87' | Report | Brown 90' | Stadium: Liberty Stadium; Attendance: 14,774 |

| 31 January 2009 30 | Preston North End | 0–0 | Sheffield United | Preston |
| | | Report | | Stadium: Deepdale; Attendance: 14,889 |

| 3 February 2009 31 | Preston North End | 1–1 | Plymouth Argyle | Preston |
| | Parkin 43' | Report | Mackie 13' | Stadium: Deepdale; Attendance: 10,660 |

| 7 February 2009 32 | Reading | 0–0 | Preston North End | Reading |
| | | Report | | Stadium: Madejski Stadium; Attendance: 19,570 |

| 14 February 2009 33 | Preston North End | 1–0 | Norwich City | Preston |
| | Parkin 41' | Report | | Stadium: Deepdale; Attendance: 12,033 |

| 21 February 2009 34 | Southampton | 3–1 | Preston North End | Southampton |
| | Surman 19' Saganowski 29', 42' | Report | Wallace 73' | Stadium: St Mary's Stadium; Attendance: 14,790 |

| 28 February 2009 35 | Preston North End | 3–2 | Ipswich Town | Preston |
| | Davidson 6' (pen.) Parkin 41' Elliott 61' | Report | Miller 31', 63' | Stadium: Deepdale; Attendance: 12,709 |

| 3 March 2009 36 | Nottingham Forest | 2–1 | Preston North End | Nottingham |
| | Earnshaw 58', 71' | Report | Parkin 63' | Stadium: City Ground; Attendance: 17,568 |

| 7 March 2009 37 | Crystal Palace | 2–1 | Preston North End | London |
| | Stokes 32' Danns 34' | Report | Jones 29' | Stadium: Selhurst Park; Attendance: 16,340 |

| 10 March 2009 38 | Preston North End | 1–1 | Sheffield Wednesday | Preston |
| | Parkin 90' | Report | Jeffers 30' | Stadium: Deepdale; Attendance: 12,381 |

| 14 March 2009 39 | Preston North End | 2–1 | Coventry City | Preston |
| | Turner (o.g.) Parkin 72' | Report | Morrison 17' | Stadium: Deepdale; Attendance: 13,251 |

| 21 March 2009 40 | Charlton Athletic | 0–0 | Preston North End | London |
| | | Report | | Stadium: The Valley; Attendance: 19,215 |

| 4 April 2009 41 | Bristol City | 1–1 | Preston North End | Bristol |
| | Maynard 59' | Report | Mawene 69' | Stadium: Ashton Gate; Attendance: 16,596 |

| 11 April 2009 42 | Preston North End | 0–1 | Blackpool | Preston |
| | | Report | Adam 43' | Stadium: Deepdale; Attendance: 21,273 |

| 13 April 2009 43 | Doncaster Rovers | 0–2 | Preston North End | Doncaster |
| | | Report | Brown 26' Mellor 72' | Stadium: Keepmoat Stadium; Attendance: 11,648 |

| 13 April 2009 44 | Preston North End | 6–0 | Cardiff City | Preston |
| | Mellor 17', 41' Parkin 51' Kennedy (o.g.) Brown 75' Lee Williamson 86' | Report | | Stadium: Deepdale; Attendance: 13,692 |

| 25 April 2009 45 | Birmingham City | 1–2 | Preston North End | Birmingham |
| | Fahey 57' | Report | McKenna 69' Wallace 89' | Stadium: St Andrews; Attendance: 24,825 |

| 3 May 2009 46 | Preston North End | 2–1 | Queens Park Rangers | Preston |
| | Parkin 37' St Ledger 74' | Report | Agyemang 57' | Stadium: Deepdale; Attendance: 18,264 |

=== Football League Playoffs ===
| 8 May 2009 Semi Final 1st Leg | Preston North End | 1–1 | Sheffield United | Preston |
| | St Ledger 21' | Report | Howard 46' | Stadium: Deepdale; Attendance: 19,840 |

| 11 May 2009 Semi Final Second Leg | Sheffield United | 1–0 | Preston North End | Sheffield |
| | Halford 59' | Report | | Stadium: Bramall Lane; Attendance: 26,354 |

=== FA Cup ===
| 3 January 2009 3 | Preston North End | 0–1 | Liverpool | Preston |
| | | Report | Riera 25' Torres 90' | Stadium: Deepdale; Attendance: 23,046 |

=== League Cup ===
| 12 August 2008 1 | Preston North End | 2–0 | Chesterfield | Preston |
| | Mellor 37', 90' | Report | | Stadium: Deepdale; Attendance: 5,150 |

| 26 August 2008 2 | Preston North End | 0–1 | Derby County | Preston |
| | | Report | Green 40' | Stadium: Deepdale; Attendance: 8,037 |

== Players ==
=== First-team squad ===
Note: Flags indicate national team as defined under FIFA eligibility rules; some limited exceptions apply. Players may hold more than one non-FIFA nationality.

| No. | Pos. | Nation | Player |
|---|---|---|---|
| 1 | GK | ENG | Andy Lonergan |
| 2 | DF | SCO | Michael Hart |
| 3 | DF | SCO | Callum Davidson |
| 4 | MF | ENG | Richard Chaplow |
| 5 | DF | FRA | Youl Mawéné |
| 6 | MF | JAM | Lee Williamson (Note: Williamson was born in Derby, England, but also qualified to represent Jamaica internationally and was called up by Jamaica in 2008 before making his international debut for Jamaica in September 2015.) (on loan from Watford) |
| 7 | MF | ENG | Chris Sedgwick |
| 8 | FW | ENG | Karl Hawley |
| 9 | FW | ENG | Chris Brown |
| 10 | MF | SCO | Barry Nicholson |
| 11 | MF | ENG | Darren Carter |
| 12 | DF | IRL | Sean St Ledger (Note: St Ledger was born in Solihull, England, but also qualified to represent the Republic of Ireland internationally through his grandfather and made his international debut for the Republic of Ireland in May 2009.) |
| 14 | DF | ENG | Liam Chilvers |
| 15 | MF | ENG | Simon Whaley |
| 16 | MF | ENG | Paul McKenna (captain) |

| No. | Pos. | Nation | Player |
|---|---|---|---|
| 19 | DF | ENG | Billy Jones |
| 21 | DF | ENG | Neal Trotman |
| 22 | GK | IRL | Wayne Henderson |
| 25 | MF | SCO | Ross Wallace |
| 26 | FW | ENG | Jon Parkin |
| 27 | DF | IRL | Eddie Nolan |
| 29 | FW | IRL | Stephen Elliott |
| 30 | GK | ENG | Chris Neal |
| 31 | GK | ENG | Andrew Murphy |
| 33 | FW | ENG | Neil Mellor |
| 34 | MF | CAN | Phil Appiah |
| 35 | DF | ENG | Dean Stott |
| 36 | FW | ENG | Rob Turner |
| 40 | MF | NIR | Adam Barton (Note: Barton was born in Clitheroe, England, but also qualified to represent Northern Ireland and the Republic of Ireland internationally through his parents and represented Northern Ireland at U-21 level before making his debut for Northern Ireland in November 2010 and then representing the Republic of Ireland at U-21 level.) |

=== Left club during season ===
Note: Flags indicate national team as defined under FIFA eligibility rules; some limited exceptions apply. Players may hold more than one non-FIFA nationality.

| No. | Pos. | Nation | Player |
|---|---|---|---|
| 6 | MF | ENG | Jason Jarrett (to Brighton & Hove Albion) |
| 6 | DF | ENG | Andrew Davies (on loan from Stoke City) |
| 17 | FW | ENG | Brett Ormerod (to Blackpool) |
| 18 | DF | ENG | Matt Hill (to Wolverhampton Wanderers) |

| No. | Pos. | Nation | Player |
|---|---|---|---|
| 18 | DF | ENG | Wayne Brown (on loan from Hull City) |
| 20 | DF | SCO | Jay McEveley (Note: McEveley was born in Liverpool, England, and represented England at U-20 and U-21 level, but also qualified to represent Scotland internationally and represented Scotland at B level before making his international debut for Scotland in August 2007.) (on loan from Derby County) |
| 23 | MF | ENG | Lewis Neal (to Carlisle United) |
| 24 | MF | ENG | Joe Anyinsah (to Carlisle United) |

== Transfers ==
=== In ===
| Date | Nation | Position | Name | Club From | Fee |
|---|---|---|---|---|---|
| 30 June 2008 | (Scotland) | MF | Barry Nicholson | Aberdeen | Free |
| 1 September 2008 | (England) | FW | Jon Parkin | Stoke City | Undisclosed |
| 1 September 2008 | (Republic of Ireland) | FW | Stephen Elliott | Wolverhampton Wanderers | Undisclosed |
| 2 January 2009 | (Republic of Ireland) | DF | Eddie Nolan | Blackburn Rovers | Undisclosed |
| 12 January 2009 | (Scotland) | MF | Ross Wallace | Sunderland | Undisclosed |

=== Out ===
| Date | Nation | Position | Name | Club To | Fee |
|---|---|---|---|---|---|
| 1 September 2008 | (England) | DF | Matt Hill | Wolverhampton Wanderers | Undisclosed |
| 9 January 2009 | (England) | MF | Joe Anyinsah | Carlisle United | Undisclosed |
| 27 January 2009 | (England) | MF | Jason Jarrett | Brighton & Hove Albion | Free |
| 30 January 2009 | (England) | FW | Brett Ormerod | Blackpool | Undisclosed |
| 31 January 2009 | (England) | MF | Lewis Neal | Carlisle United | Free |

=== Loan In ===
| Date | Nation | Position | Name | Club From | Length |
|---|---|---|---|---|---|
| 31 July 2008 | (Scotland) | MF | Ross Wallace | Sunderland | Until January |
| 29 September 2008 | (Scotland) | DF | Jay McEveley | Derby County | One Month |
| 7 October 2008 | (Republic of Ireland) | DF | Eddie Nolan | Blackburn Rovers | Until January |
| 27 October 2008 | (England) | DF | Wayne Brown | Hull City | One Month |
| 13 February 2009 | (England) | DF | Andrew Davies | Stoke City | One Month |
| 26 March 2009 | (England) | MF | Lee Williamson | Watford | Until end of season |

=== Loan Out ===
| Date | Nation | Position | Name | Club To | Length |
|---|---|---|---|---|---|
| 11 September 2008 | (England) | MF | Joe Anyinsah | Brighton & Hove Albion | One Month |
| 11 September 2008 | (England) | FW | Karl Hawley | Northampton Town | One Month |
| 31 October 2008 | (England) | MF | Lewis Neal | Notts County | One Month |
| 27 February 2009 | (Republic of Ireland) | GK | Wayne Henderson | Grimsby Town | One Month |
| 19 March 2009 | (England) | DF | Neal Trotman | Colchester United | One Month |
| 20 March 2009 | (England) | FW | Karl Hawley | Colchester United | One Month |
