= 2006–07 Preston North End F.C. season =

English football club season

Preston North End
2006–07 season
- Chairman: Derek Shaw
- Manager: Paul Simpson
- Stadium: Deepdale
- Championship: 7th
- FA Cup: Fifth round
- League Cup: First round
- Top goalscorer: League: David Nugent (15); All: David Nugent (17)
- Average home league attendance: 14,430

During the 2006–07 English football season, Preston North End F.C. competed in the Football League Championship.

== Season summary ==
The 2006–07 season started well under Simpson, seeing Preston rise to the top of the Championship in December, the highest league place the team has reached in 55 years. Despite much interest in striker David Nugent, Simpson was able to hold on to the player throughout the January transfer window. On 28 March, Nugent went on to get his full international debut for England, and even managed to score his first international goal in the 90th minute of the match against Andorra. This was the first time a Preston player received a full international cap for England since Tom Finney. It was around this time that Preston went into a decline, which in the end meant the team missing out on a playoff spot in the final few weeks of the season.

== Final league table ==
Pos	Team	Pld	W	D	L	GF	GA	GD	Pts	Promotion, qualification or relegation
5	Wolverhampton Wanderers	46	22	10	14	59	56	+3	76	Qualification for Championship play-offs
6	Southampton	46	21	12	13	77	53	+24	75	Qualification for Championship play-offs
7	Preston North End	46	22	8	16	64	53	+11	74	
8	Stoke City	46	19	16	11	62	41	+21	73	
9	Sheffield Wednesday	46	20	11	15	70	66	+4	71	

Source: RSSSF
Rules for classification: In the Football League goals scored (F) takes precedence over goal difference (GD).

== Results ==
Preston North End's score comes first

=== Legend ===
Win	Draw	Loss

=== Football League Championship ===
Date	Opponent	Venue	Result	Attendance	Scorers
5 August 2006	Sheffield Wednesday	H	0–0	15,650	
8 August 2006	Norwich City	A	0–2	24,676	
11 August 2006	Wolverhampton Wanderers	A	3–1	17,410	Nugent (2), Whaley
19 August 2006	Queens Park Rangers	H	1–1	11,879	McKenna
26 August 2006	Southampton	A	1–1	20,712	Whaley
9 September 2006	Cardiff City	H	2–1	12,435	Agyemang, Pugh
12 September 2006	West Bromwich Albion	H	1–0	12,119	Agyemang
16 September 2006	Derby County	A	1–1	22,220	Pugh
22 September 2006	Barnsley	H	1–0	11,728	Agyemang
30 September 2006	Stoke City	A	1–1	14,342	Agyemang
14 October 2006	Sunderland	H	4–1	19,603	Dichio, Alexander (pen), Whitehead (own goal), Whaley
17 October 2006	Ipswich Town	A	3–2	19,377	Nugent, Chilvers, Whaley
21 October 2006	Hull City	H	2–1	13,728	Dichio (2)
27 October 2006	Burnley	A	2–3	14,871	Whaley, Ormerod
31 October 2006	Leeds United	H	4–1	16,168	Dichio, Pugh, Nugent, L Neal
4 November 2006	Luton Town	H	3–0	13,094	Alexander (pen), Agyemang, Ormerod
11 November 2006	Southend United	A	0–0	9,263	
18 November 2006	Leicester City	A	1–0	22,721	Agyemang
25 November 2006	Crystal Palace	H	0–0	14,202	
28 November 2006	Coventry City	H	1–1	13,104	Nugent
2 December 2006	Luton Town	A	0–2	7,665	
9 December 2006	Birmingham City	A	1–3	23,159	Ormerod
16 December 2006	Plymouth Argyle	H	3–0	13,171	Pugh, Ormerod, Alexander (pen)
23 December 2006	Colchester United	H	1–0	14,225	Nugent
26 December 2006	West Bromwich Albion	A	2–4	22,905	Alexander (pen), Nugent
30 December 2006	Sunderland	A	1–0	30,460	Nugent
1 January 2007	Derby County	H	1–2	19,204	Nugent
13 January 2007	Barnsley	A	1–0	10,810	Chilvers
20 January 2007	Stoke City	H	3–2	15,151	McKenna, Nugent, Wilson
30 January 2007	Colchester United	A	0–1	5,085	
3 February 2007	Sheffield Wednesday	A	3–1	22,441	Ormerod, Nugent (2)
10 February 2007	Wolverhampton Wanderers	H	0–1	15,748	
20 February 2007	Norwich City	H	2–1	11,601	Pergl, Dichio
23 February 2007	Cardiff City	A	1–4	12,889	Alexander (pen)
5 March 2007	Southampton	H	3–1	13,060	Mellor, Nugent, Baird (own goal)
10 March 2007	Hull City	A	0–2	17,118	
13 March 2007	Ipswich Town	H	1–0	12,925	Ricketts
17 March 2007	Burnley	H	2–0	17,666	Nugent, Agyemang
30 March 2007	Leeds United	A	1–2	18,433	Ormerod
3 April 2007	Queens Park Rangers	A	0–1	11,910	
7 April 2007	Crystal Palace	A	0–3	15,985	
9 April 2007	Southend United	H	2–3	13,684	St Ledger, Alexander (pen)
14 April 2007	Coventry City	H	4–0	21,117	Sedgwick, Nugent, Ormerod (2)
21 April 2007	Leicester City	H	0–1	14,725	
28 April 2007	Plymouth Argyle	A	0–2	13,813	
6 May 2007	Birmingham City	H	1–0	16,387	Whaley

=== FA Cup ===
Round	Date	Opponent	Venue	Result	Attendance	Goalscorers
R3	6 January 2007	Sunderland	H	1–0	10,318	Ormerod
R4	17 January 2007	Crystal Palace	A	2–0	8,422	Nugent, Wilson
R5	18 February 2007	Manchester City	H	1–3	18,890	Nugent

=== League Cup ===
Round	Date	Opponent	Venue	Result	Attendance	Goalscorers
R1	23 August 2006	Port Vale	A	1–2	3,522	Whaley

== Squad ==
Note: Flags indicate national team as defined under FIFA eligibility rules; some limited exceptions apply. Players may hold more than one non-FIFA nationality.

No.	Pos.	Nation	Player
1	GK	ENG	Andy Lonergan
2	DF	SCO	Graham Alexander
3	DF	SCO	Callum Davidson
4	MF	ENG	Danny Pugh
5	DF	FRA	Youl Mawéné
6	MF	ENG	Jason Jarrett
7	MF	ENG	Chris Sedgwick
8	FW	ENG	Michael Ricketts
9	FW	GHA	Patrick Agyemang
10	FW	ENG	David Nugent
12	DF	IRL	Sean St Ledger
13	GK	IRL	Wayne Henderson
14	DF	ENG	Liam Chilvers
15	MF	ENG	Simon Whaley
16	DF	ENG	Paul McKenna
17	FW	ENG	Brett Ormerod

No.	Pos.	Nation	Player
18	DF	ENG	Matthew Hill
20	DF	CZE	Pavel Pergl
21	FW	ENG	Dave Hibbert
22	GK	ENG	Carlo Nash
23	MF	ENG	Lewis Neal
24	FW	ENG	Joe Anyinsah
25	MF	ENG	Adam Nowland
26	MF	CMR	Franck Songo'o (on loan from Portsmouth)
27	DF	GAM	Seyfo Soley
28	DF	ENG	Kelvin Wilson
29	GK	ENG	Ben Hinchcliffe
30	GK	ENG	Chris Neal
31	MF	ENG	Warren Beattie
32	MF	ENG	Ashley Parillon
33	FW	ENG	Neil Mellor
34	FW	ENG	Chris McGrail

=== Left club during season ===
Note: Flags indicate national team as defined under FIFA eligibility rules; some limited exceptions apply. Players may hold more than one non-FIFA nationality.

No.	Pos.	Nation	Player
8	MF	SCO	Brian O'Neil (retired)
27	MF	IRL	Alan McCormack (to Southend United)
20	MF	SCO	Tommy Miller (on loan from Sunderland)

No.	Pos.	Nation	Player
26	MF	WAL	Brian Stock (to Doncaster Rovers)
19	FW	NIR	Andy Smith (to Bristol City)
11	FW	ENG	Danny Dichio (to Toronto FC)

== Transfers ==
=== In ===
- (Republic of Ireland) Sean St Ledger – (England) Peterborough United, £225,000
- (England) Liam Chilvers – (England) Colchester United, free
- (England) Neil Mellor – (England) Liverpool
- (England) Michael Ricketts – (England) Southend United, free
- (Czech Republic) Pavel Pergl – (Czech Republic) Sparta Prague, free
- (The Gambia) Seyfo Soley – (Belgium) Genk, free
- (England) Wayne Henderson – (England) Brighton & Hove Albion, £200,000

=== Out ===
- (Jamaica) Tyrone Mears – (England) West Ham United, £1,000,000
- (England) Mark Jackson – (England) Southport, free
- (Republic of Ireland) Alan McCormack – (England) Southend United, free
- (Wales) Brian Stock – (England) Doncaster Rovers, £150,000
- (Northern Ireland) Andy Smith – (England) Bristol City, free
- (England) Danny Dichio – (Canada) Toronto FC, free
