= 2005–06 Preston North End F.C. season =

English football club season

Preston North End
2005–06 season
- Chairman: Derek Shaw
- Manager: Billy Davies
- Stadium: Deepdale
- Football League Championship: 4th
- FA Cup: Fourth round
- League Cup: First round
- Top goalscorer: League: Nugent (10); All: Nugent (11)
- Average home league attendance: 14,613

During the 2005–06 English football season, Preston North End F.C. competed in the Football League Championship.

== Season summary ==
In the 2005–06 season, Billy Davies and his assistant David Kelly were rewarded for their success with new and improved contracts in June 2005 and repaid the board's faith by leading Preston to the play-offs for the second year in succession. However, this time they were knocked out in the semi-final stage by Leeds United.

In June 2006, Davies left his post at Deepdale to become manager of Derby County.

== Final league table ==
Pos	Team	Pld	W	D	L	GF	GA	GD	Pts	Promotion, qualification or relegation
2	Sheffield United (P)	46	26	12	8	76	46	+30	90	Promotion to the FA Premier League
3	Watford (O, P)	46	22	15	9	77	53	+24	81	Qualification for Championship play-offs
4	Preston North End	46	20	20	6	59	30	+29	80	Qualification for Championship play-offs
5	Leeds United	46	21	15	10	57	38	+19	78	Qualification for Championship play-offs
6	Crystal Palace	46	21	12	13	67	48	+19	75	Qualification for Championship play-offs

Updated to match(es) played on 2 December 2011. Source: RSSSF
Rules for classification: 1) points; 2) goal difference; 3) number of goals scored.
(O) Play-off winners; (P) Promoted

== Results ==
Preston North End's score comes first

=== Legend ===
Win	Draw	Loss

=== Football League Championship ===
Date	Opponent	Venue	Result	Attendance	Scorers
6 August 2005	Watford	A	2–1	12,597	Nugent, Etuhu
8 August 2005	Derby County	H	1–1	13,127	Nugent
13 August 2005	Reading	H	0–3	13,154	
20 August 2005	Sheffield United	A	1–2	20,519	McKenna
27 August 2005	Brighton & Hove Albion	H	0–0	12,461	
29 August 2005	Ipswich Town	A	4–0	22,551	Nugent (2), Jones, Agyemang
10 September 2005	Millwall	A	2–1	7,674	Jones, Agyemang
13 September 2005	Burnley	H	0–0	17,139	
16 September 2005	Stoke City	H	0–1	12,453	
24 September 2005	Crystal Palace	A	1–1	17,291	Lucketti
27 September 2005	Luton Town	A	0–3	7,815	
1 October 2005	Southampton	H	1–1	15,263	Agyemang
15 October 2005	Queens Park Rangers	H	1–1	13,660	Mawéné
18 October 2005	Cardiff City	A	2–2	9,574	Mears, Sedgwick
22 October 2005	Wolverhampton Wanderers	A	1–1	22,802	Etuhu
29 October 2005	Leicester City	H	0–0	13,904	
1 November 2005	Hull City	H	3–0	13,536	Johnson, Jones, McKenna
5 November 2005	Leeds United	A	0–0	22,289	
19 November 2005	Cardiff City	H	2–1	13,904	Sedgwick, Agyemang
22 November 2005	Queens Park Rangers	A	2–0	10,901	Nugent, Davidson
26 November 2005	Watford	H	1–1	14,638	Davidson
3 December 2005	Crewe Alexandra	A	2–0	6,364	Davidson, Nowland
10 December 2005	Derby County	A	1–1	22,740	Davis
16 December 2005	Sheffield United	H	0–0	14,378	
26 December 2005	Sheffield Wednesday	H	0–0	18,867	
31 December 2005	Coventry City	H	3–1	12,936	Nowland, Alexander (pen), Sedgwick
2 January 2006	Norwich City	A	3–0	25,032	Nowland, Alexander (pen), Nugent
14 January 2006	Millwall	H	2–0	14,165	Agyemang, Davis
21 January 2006	Burnley	A	2–0	17,220	Nugent, Alexander (pen)
31 January 2006	Crystal Palace	H	2–0	13,867	Ormerod, O'Neil
4 February 2006	Stoke City	A	0–0	13,218	
11 February 2006	Luton Town	H	5–1	15,237	Neal, Nugent, Mears, Sedgwick (pen), Davis
15 February 2006	Southampton	A	0–0	19,534	
25 February 2006	Reading	A	1–2	23,011	Davidson
7 March 2006	Plymouth Argyle	A	0–0	10,874	
11 March 2006	Brighton & Hove Albion	H	0–0	6,361	
14 March 2006	Ipswich Town	H	3–1	14,507	Nugent (2), Agyemang
18 March 2006	Sheffield Wednesday	A	0–2	23,429	
25 March 2006	Plymouth Argyle	H	0–0	13,925	
28 March 2006	Crewe Alexandra	H	1–0	13,170	Ormerod
1 April 2006	Coventry City	A	1–0	21,023	Whaley
8 April 2006	Norwich City	H	2–0	15,714	Shackell (own goal), Doherty (own goal)
15 April 2006	Leicester City	A	2–1	21,865	Whaley, Jarrett
17 April 2006	Wolverhampton Wanderers	H	2–0	16,885	Neal, Ormerod
22 April 2006	Hull City	A	1–1	19,716	Whaley
30 April 2006	Leeds United	H	2–0	19,350	Stock, Ormerod

=== Football League Championship play-offs ===
Round	Date	Opponent	Venue	Result	Attendance	Goalscorers
SF 1st leg	5 May 2006	Leeds United	A	1–1	35,239	Nugent
SF 2nd leg	8 May 2006	Leeds United	H	0–2 (lost 1–3 on agg)	20,383	

=== FA Cup ===
Round	Date	Opponent	Venue	Result	Attendance	Goalscorers
R3	7 January 2006	Crewe Alexandra	H	2–1	8,380	Alexander, Sedgwick
R4	28 January 2006	Crystal Palace	H	1–1	9,489	O'Neil
R4R	7 February 2006	Crystal Palace	A	2–1	7,356	Dichio (2)
R5	19 February 2006	Middlesbrough	H	0–2	19,877	

=== League Cup ===
Round	Date	Opponent	Venue	Result	Attendance	Goalscorers
R1	23 August 2005	Barnsley	H	2–2 (lost 4–5 on pens)	3,137	Dichio, Alexander (pen)

== First-team squad ==
Squad at end of season

Note: Flags indicate national team as defined under FIFA eligibility rules; some limited exceptions apply. Players may hold more than one non-FIFA nationality.

No.	Pos.	Nation	Player
1	GK	ENG	Andy Lonergan
2	DF	SCO	Graham Alexander
3	DF	SCO	Callum Davidson
4	DF	JAM	Claude Davis
5	DF	FRA	Youl Mawéné
6	MF	ENG	Jason Jarrett (on loan from Norwich City)
7	MF	ENG	Chris Sedgwick
8	MF	SCO	Brian O'Neil
9	FW	GHA	Patrick Agyemang
10	FW	ENG	David Nugent
11	FW	ENG	Danny Dichio
12	GK	ENG	Gavin Ward
14	DF	ENG	Tyrone Mears
15	MF	ENG	Simon Whaley
16	MF	ENG	Paul McKenna
17	FW	ENG	Brett Ormerod

No.	Pos.	Nation	Player
18	DF	ENG	Matt Hill
19	FW	NIR	Andy Smith
20	DF	ENG	Chris Lucketti
21	FW	ENG	Dave Hibbert
22	GK	ENG	Carlo Nash
23	MF	ENG	Lewis Neal
24	MF	ENG	Joe Anyinsah
25	MF	ENG	Adam Nowland
26	MF	WAL	Brian Stock
27	MF	IRL	Alan McCormack
28	DF	ENG	Kelvin Wilson
29	FW	ENG	Mark Jackson
30	GK	ENG	Chris Neal
31	FW	ENG	Marcus Stewart (on loan from Bristol City)
32	MF	ENG	Ashley Parillon
34	MF	ENG	Warren Beattie
33	GK	ENG	Nathan kerr

=== Left club during season ===
Note: Flags indicate national team as defined under FIFA eligibility rules; some limited exceptions apply. Players may hold more than one non-FIFA nationality.

No.	Pos.	Nation	Player
25	FW	ENG	Richard Cresswell (to Leeds United)
33	FW	USA	Jemal Johnson (on loan from Blackburn Rovers)
6	MF	ENG	David Jones (on loan from Manchester United)
15	MF	NGA	Dickson Etuhu (to Norwich City)

No.	Pos.	Nation	Player
31	DF	IRL	David Elebert (to Hamilton Academical)
17	MF	FRA	Eric Skora (to Kilmarnock)
28	MF	ENG	Michael Brown (to Lancaster City)
