= Stefanou =

Stefanou or Stephanou is a Greek surname.

- Eusebius A. Stephanou
- Georgios Stefanou
- Georgios Stephanou
- Petros Stefanou
- Stef Stefanou
- Stefanos Stefanou
- Stelio Stefanou
