= 2004–05 West Ham United F.C. season =

English football team season

West Ham United
2004–05 season
- Chairman: Terry Brown
- Manager: Alan Pardew
- Stadium: Boleyn Ground
- Championship: 6th
- Play-offs: Winners
- FA Cup: Fourth round
- League Cup: Third round
- Top goalscorer: League: Teddy Sheringham (20); All: Marlon Harewood (22)
- Average home league attendance: 27,403

During the 2004–05 English football season, West Ham United competed in the Football League Championship, having lost the previous season's play-off final 0–1 to Crystal Palace at the Millennium Stadium.

== Season summary ==
Following the previous season's First Division play-off final loss to Crystal Palace, Rob Lee, Brian Deane, Wayne Quinn and Shaun Byrne were all released from West Ham on free transfers. They were closely followed by Kevin Horlock, who signed for Ipswich Town, and David Connolly, who left for Leicester City in a £500,000 deal. Sébastien Carole also returned to Monaco after his loan spell, while Richard Garcia and Elliott Ward signed new contracts.

The first signing Alan Pardew made following the end of the previous season was goalkeeper James Walker, signed on a free transfer from Walsall, where he had been a folk hero. He was brought in as cover for Stephen Bywater. The following month former England international Teddy Sheringham and Serhii Rebrov both signed on free transfers, from Portsmouth and Tottenham respectively. Their arrivals were closely followed by those of AFC Bournemouth captain Carl Fletcher for £275,000 and winger Luke Chadwick from Manchester United on a free transfer. In September, Malky Mackay signed for £300,000 from Norwich City.

West Ham's biggest defeat of the season was away to Cardiff City on 2 November 2004 when they lost 4–1. The Welsh team featured former Hammer Jobi McAnuff, who created the first two goals and scored the fourth. West Ham's biggest win of the season came in their home game against Plymouth Argyle on 19 February 2005 when they won 5–0.

West Ham only lost one of their last ten matches, which helped moved them from seventh to sixth, guaranteeing a play-off spot. The club returned to the FA Premier League at the second time of asking, defeating Preston North End in the 2005 Football League Championship play-off final with a single goal from Bobby Zamora.

== Final league table ==
Pos	Team	Pld	W	D	L	GF	GA	GD	Pts	Promotion, qualification or relegation
4	Derby County	46	22	10	14	71	60	+11	76	Qualification for Championship play-offs
5	Preston North End	46	21	12	13	67	58	+9	75	Qualification for Championship play-offs
6	West Ham United (O, P)	46	21	10	15	66	56	+10	73	Qualification for Championship play-offs
7	Reading	46	19	13	14	51	44	+7	70	
8	Sheffield United	46	18	13	15	57	56	+1	67	

Updated to match(es) played on 9 December 2011. Source: Football League Tables
Rules for classification: 1) points; 2) goal difference; 3) number of goals scored.
(O) Play-off winners; (P) Promoted

== First-team squad ==
Squad at end of season

Note: Flags indicate national team as defined under FIFA eligibility rules; some limited exceptions apply. Players may hold more than one non-FIFA nationality.

No.	Pos.	Nation	Player
1	GK	ENG	Stephen Bywater
2	DF	CZE	Tomáš Řepka
3	DF	ENG	Rufus Brevett
4	MF	SCO	Don Hutchison
5	DF	WAL	Andy Melville
6	MF	WAL	Carl Fletcher
7	DF	SCO	Christian Dailly
8	FW	ENG	Teddy Sheringham
10	FW	ENG	Marlon Harewood
11	MF	NIR	Steve Lomas
12	MF	ENG	Matthew Etherington
14	MF	ENG	Chris Cohen
15	DF	ENG	Anton Ferdinand
16	FW	UKR	Serhii Rebrov
17	MF	ENG	Hayden Mullins
18	FW	FRA	Youssef Sofiane

No.	Pos.	Nation	Player
20	MF	ENG	Nigel Reo-Coker (captain)
21	DF	SCO	Malky Mackay
22	DF	ENG	Elliott Ward
23	GK	ENG	Jimmy Walker
24	MF	ENG	Mark Noble
25	FW	ENG	Bobby Zamora
26	MF	ENG	Shaun Newton
27	FW	ENG	Greg Pearson
28	DF	AUS	Trent McClenahan
30	MF	ENG	Luke Chadwick
31	DF	ENG	Darren Blewitt
32	FW	ENG	Moses Ashikodi
34	DF	ENG	Chris Powell
35	MF	WAL	Gavin Williams
36	MF	ENG	Hogan Ephraim

=== Left club during season ===
Note: Flags indicate national team as defined under FIFA eligibility rules; some limited exceptions apply. Players may hold more than one non-FIFA nationality.

No.	Pos.	Nation	Player
6	MF	ENG	Michael Carrick (to Tottenham Hotspur)
9	MF	JAM	Jobi McAnuff (to Cardiff City)
9	DF	ARG	Mauricio Taricco (released)
19	MF	ENG	Adam Nowland (to Nottingham Forest)
19	DF	ENG	Darren Powell (on loan from Crystal Palace)

No.	Pos.	Nation	Player
21	FW	AUS	Richard Garcia (to Colchester United)
26	DF	ENG	Calum Davenport (on loan from Tottenham Hotspur)
29	MF	ENG	Graeme Carrick (Released)
41	GK	ENG	Robert Burch (on loan from Tottenham Hotspur)

== Summer Transfers ==
=== In ===
Date	Position	Name	Club From	Fee	Reference
10 June 2004	GK	Jimmy Walker	Walsall	Free	
14 July 2004	FW	Teddy Sheringham	Portsmouth	Free	
27 July 2004	FW	Serhii Rebrov	Tottenham Hotspur	Free	
2 August 2004	MF	Luke Chadwick	Manchester United	Free	
31 August 2004	MF	Carl Fletcher	Bournemouth	£275,000	
10 September 2004	DF	Chris Powell	Charlton Athletic	Loan	
10 September 2004	DF	Malky Mackay	Norwich City	£300,000	

=== Out ===
Date	Position	Name	Club To	Fee	Reference
1 July 2004	DF	Shaun Byrne	Free Agency	End of Contract	
1 July 2004	FW	Brian Deane	Free Agency	End of Contract	
1 July 2004	GK	David Forde	Free Agency	End of Contract	
1 July 2004	MF	Daryl McMahon	Free Agency	End of Contract	
1 July 2004	MF	Robert Lee	Free Agency	End of Contract	
9 July 2004	MF	Kevin Horlock	Ipswich Town	Free Transfer	
21 July 2004	FW	David Connolly	Leicester City	£500.000	
12 August 2004	MF	Jobi McAnuff	Cardiff City	Undisclosed	
24 August 2004	MF	Michael Carrick	Tottenham Hotspur	£3,500,000	

== Winter Transfers ==
=== In ===
Date	Position	Name	Club From	Fee	Reference
19 November 2004	DF	Mauricio Taricco	Tottenham Hotspur	Free	
17 December 2024	DF	Chris Powell	Charlton Athletic	Free	
10 March 2005	MF	Shaun Newton	Wolverhampton Wanderers	£125,000	

=== Out ===
Date	Position	Name	Club To	Fee	Reference
5 November 2004	MF	Adam Nowland	Nottingham Forest	£250,000	
24 November 2004	DF	Mauricio Taricco	Free Agency	Released	

== Results ==
=== Championship ===
7 August 2004	Leicester City	0–0	West Ham United	Leicester
		Report		Stadium: Walkers Stadium; Attendance: 30,231; Referee: Mike Ryan

10 August 2004	West Ham United	1–0	Reading	London
	Sheringham 81'	Report		Stadium: Boleyn Ground; Attendance: 26,242; Referee: Paul Taylor

15 August 2004	West Ham United	1–3	Wigan Athletic	London
	Zamora 69'	Report	Ellington 5', 58'; Roberts 45'	Stadium: Boleyn Ground; Attendance: 23,271; Referee: Andy D'Urso

21 August 2004	Crewe Alexandra	2–3	West Ham United	Crewe
	Ashton 31', 82'	Report	Sheringham 16', 22'; Brevett 30'	Stadium: Gresty Road; Attendance: 7,857; Referee: Alan Kaye

28 August 2004	West Ham United	1–0	Burnley	London
	Nowland 62'	Report		Stadium: Boleyn Ground; Attendance: 22,119; Referee: Paul Robinson

30 August 2004	Coventry City	2–1	West Ham United	Coventry
	Doyle 45'; Morrell 76'	Report	Sheringham 42'	Stadium: Highfield Road; Attendance: 17,404; Referee: Colin Webster

11 September 2004	Sheffield United	1–2	West Ham United	Sheffield
	Quinn 65'	Report	Harewood 9'; Sheringham 85'	Stadium: Brammall Lane; Attendance: 21,058; Referee: Alan Wiley

14 September 2004	West Ham United	1–0	Rotherham United	London
	Etherington 69'	Report		Stadium: Boleyn Ground; Attendance: 26,233; Referee: Michael Jones

18 September 2004	West Ham United	1–1	Ipswich Town	London
	Mackay 11'	Report	Couñago 57'	Stadium: Boleyn Ground; Attendance: 28,812; Referee: Rob Styles

26 September 2004	Nottingham Forest	2–1	West Ham United	Nottingham
	Evans 84'; King 90'	Report	Harewood 58'	Stadium: City Ground; Attendance: 25,615; Referee: Matt Messias

29 September 2004	Derby County	1–1	West Ham United	Derby
	Johnson 6'	Report	Etherington 11'	Stadium: Pride Park; Attendance: 23,112; Referee: Graham Poll

2 October 2004	West Ham United	1–0	Wolverhampton Wanderers	London
	Sheringham 75'	Report		Stadium: Boleyn Ground; Attendance: 29,585; Referee: Barry Knight

16 October 2004	Queens Park Rangers	1–0	West Ham United	London
	Rose 22'	Report		Stadium: Loftus Road; Attendance: 18,363; Referee: Paul Taylor

19 October 2004	West Ham United	2–0	Stoke City	London
	Harewood 31'; Sheringham 59'	Report		Stadium: Boleyn Ground; Attendance: 29,808; Referee: Lee Probert

23 October 2004	West Ham United	3–1	Gillingham	London
	Zamora 18'; Harewood 25'; Mullins 39'	Report	Byfield 45'	Stadium: Boleyn Ground; Attendance: 25,247; Referee: Eddie Evans

30 October 2004	Plymouth Argyle	1–1	West Ham United	Plymouth
	Wotton 76'	Report	Lomas 43'	Stadium: Home Park; Attendance: 20,220; Referee: Andy Penn

2 November 2004	Cardiff City	4–1	West Ham United	Cardiff
	Lee 3'; Ledley 16'; Parry 54'; McAnuff 77'	Report	Harewood 69'	Stadium: Ninian Park; Attendance: 14,222; Referee: Richard Beeby

6 November 2004	West Ham United	2–1	Queens Park Rangers	London
	Harewood 36', 84'	Report	McLeod 72'	Stadium: Boleyn Ground; Attendance: 31,365; Referee: Martin Atkinson

13 November 2004	West Ham United	0–1	Brighton & Hove Albion	London
		Report	Butters 68'	Stadium: Boleyn Ground; Attendance: 29,514; Referee: Paul Armstrong

21 November 2004	Millwall	1–0	West Ham United	London
	Dichio 78'	Report		Stadium: The Den; Attendance: 15,025; Referee: Peter Walton

27 November 2004	West Ham United	3–2	Watford	London
	Reo-Coker 28'; D. Powell 30'; Rebrov 58'	Report	Gunnarsson 5'; Dyer 21'	Stadium: Boleyn Ground; Attendance: 24,541; Referee: Kevin Wright

4 December 2004	Sunderland	0–2	West Ham United	Sunderland
		Report	Harewood 59'; Sheringham 90'	Stadium: Stadium of Light; Attendance: 29,510; Referee: Graham Salisbury

10 December 2004	West Ham United	1–1	Leeds United	London
	Chadwick 50'	Report	Healy 90'	Stadium: Boleyn Ground; Attendance: 30,684; Referee: Mike Pike

18 December 2004	Preston North End	2–1	West Ham United	Preston
	Lewis 9'; O'Neil 45'	Report	Reo-Coker 50'	Stadium: Deepdale; Attendance: 13,451; Referee: Alan Kaye

26 December 2004	West Ham United	3–2	Nottingham Forest	London
	Etherington 17'; Sheringham 39', 82'	Report	Johnson 65', 68'	Stadium: Boleyn Ground; Attendance: 32,270; Referee: Andre Marriner

28 December 2004	Rotherham United	2–2	West Ham United	Rotherham
	Butler 13'; McIntosh 37'	Report	Harewood 71'; Sheringham 76'	Stadium: Millmoor; Attendance: 7,769; Referee: Iain Williamson

1 January 2005	Ipswich Town	0–2	West Ham United	Ipswich
		Report	Harewood 1'; Etherington 90'	Stadium: Portman Road; Attendance: 30,003; Referee: Paul Taylor

3 January 2005	West Ham United	0–2	Sheffield United	London
		Report	Řepka 40' (o.g.); Bromby 60'	Stadium: Boleyn Ground; Attendance: 27,424; Referee: Trevor Kettle

15 January 2005	Wolverhampton Wanderers	4–2	West Ham United	Wolverhampton
	Miller 29', 54'; Ince 72'; Cort 75'	Report	Zamora 36', 57'	Stadium: Molineux; Attendance: 28,411; Referee: Clive Penton

23 January 2005	West Ham United	1–2	Derby County	London
	Fletcher 26'	Report	Rasiak 10', 63'	Stadium: Boleyn Ground; Attendance: 30,347; Referee: Lee Mason

6 February 2005	West Ham United	1–0	Cardiff City	London
	Fletcher 89'	Report		Stadium: Boleyn Ground; Attendance: 23,716; Referee: Keith Stroud

19 February 2005	West Ham United	5–0	Plymouth Argyle	London
	Harewood 10'; McCormick 23' (o.g.); Mackay 40'; Sheringham 76', 84'	Report		Stadium: Boleyn Ground; Attendance: 25,490; Referee: Kevin Friend

22 February 2005	Gillingham	0–1	West Ham United	Gillingham
		Report	Harewood 13'	Stadium: Priestfield Stadium; Attendance: 9,510; Referee: Phil Crossley

26 February 2005	Leeds United	2–1	West Ham United	Leeds
	Hulse 51'; Derry 86'	Report	Williams 68'	Stadium: Elland Road; Attendance: 34,115; Referee: Andy Hall

5 March 2005	West Ham United	1–2	Preston North End	London
	Zamora 87'	Report	Nugent 17'; Agyemang 81'	Stadium: Boleyn Ground; Attendance: 26,442; Referee: Steve Tanner

12 March 2005	Reading	3–1	West Ham United	Reading
	Kitson 13', 27', 57'	Report	Sheringham 82'	Stadium: Madejski Stadium; Attendance: 22,268; Referee: Phil Joslin

15 March 2005	West Ham United	1–1	Crewe Alexandra	London
	Sheringham 76'	Report	Jones 90'	Stadium: Boleyn Ground; Attendance: 26,593; Referee: Mike Thorpe

18 March 2005	West Ham United	2–2	Leicester City	London
	Sheringham 28', 62'	Report	Connolly 25'; Gillespie 44'	Stadium: Boleyn Ground; Attendance: 22,031; Referee: Andre Marriner

2 April 2005	Wigan Athletic	1–2	West Ham United	Wigan
	Roberts 51'	Report	Sheringham 55'; Harewood 67'	Stadium: JJB Stadium; Attendance: 12,993; Referee: Brian Curson

5 April 2005	Burnley	0–1	West Ham United	Burnley
		Report	Sheringham 83'	Stadium: Turf Moor; Attendance: 12,209; Referee: Kevin Friend

9 April 2005	West Ham United	3–0	Coventry City	London
	Shaw 76' (o.g.); Sheringham 89'; Zamora 90'	Report		Stadium: Boleyn Ground; Attendance: 26,839; Referee: Iain Williamson

16 April 2005	West Ham United	1–1	Millwall	London
	Harewood 35'	Report	Hayles 12'	Stadium: Boleyn Ground; Attendance: 28,221; Referee: Uriah Rennie

19 April 2005	Stoke City	0–1	West Ham United	Stoke-on-Trent
		Report	Zamora 78'	Stadium: Britannia Stadium; Attendance: 14,534; Referee: Graham Laws

23 April 2005	Brighton & Hove Albion	2–2	West Ham United	Brighton
	Hammond 54', 90'	Report	Reo-Coker 8'; Harewood 55'	Stadium: Withdean Stadium; Attendance: 6,819; Referee: Andy Penn

29 April 2005	West Ham United	1–2	Sunderland	London
	Harewood 43'	Report	Arca 52'; Elliott 87'	Stadium: Boleyn Ground; Attendance: 33,482; Referee: Richard Beeby

8 May 2005	Watford	1–2	West Ham United	Watford
	Helguson 89'	Report	Ferdinand 42'; Harewood 70'	Stadium: Vicarage Road; Attendance: 19,673; Referee: Andy D'Urso

=== Championship play-offs ===
14 May 2005	West Ham United	2–2	Ipswich Town	London
	Harewood 7'; Zamora 13'	Report	Walker 45' (o.g.); Kuqi 74'	Stadium: Boleyn Ground; Attendance: 33,723; Referee: Uriah Rennie

18 May 2005	Ipswich Town	0–2 (2–4 agg.)	West Ham United	Ipswich
		Report	Zamora 61', 72'	Stadium: Portman Road; Attendance: 30,010; Referee: Steve Dunn

30 May 2005	Preston North End	0–1	West Ham United	Cardiff
		Report	Zamora 57'	Stadium: Millennium Stadium; Attendance: 70,275; Referee: Mike Riley

=== League Cup ===
24 August 2004 First Round	West Ham United	2–0	Southend United	London
	Harewood 11', 90'	Report		Stadium: Boleyn Ground; Attendance: 16,910; Referee: Paul Armstrong

21 September 2004 Second Round	West Ham United	3–2	Notts County	London
	Zamora 1', 54'; Rebrov 62'	Report	Wilson 13'; Richardson 57'	Stadium: Boleyn Ground; Attendance: 11,111; Referee: Iaian Williamson

27 October 2004 Third Round	Chelsea	1–0	West Ham United	London
	Kežman 57'	Report		Stadium: Stamford Bridge; Attendance: 41,774; Referee: Andy D'Urso

=== FA Cup ===
8 January 2005 Third Round	West Ham United	1–0	Norwich City	London
	Harewood 81'	Report		Stadium: Boleyn Ground; Attendance: 23,389; Referee: Uriah Rennie

29 January 2005 Fourth Round	West Ham United	1–1	Sheffield United	London
	Harewood 39'	Report	Jagielka 57'	Stadium: Boleyn Ground; Attendance: 19,444; Referee: Dermot Gallagher

13 February 2005 Fourth Round Replay	Sheffield United	1–1 (a.e.t.) (3–1 p)	West Ham United	Sheffield
	Liddell 8'	Report	Sheringham 63'	Stadium: Brammall Lane; Attendance: 15,067; Referee: Mark Clattenburg
	Penalties
	Gray (penalty scored); Tonge (penalty missed); Jagielka (penalty missed); Harley (penalty scored); Liddell (penalty scored)		Sheringham (penalty missed); Harewood (penalty missed); Noble (penalty scored); Fletcher (penalty missed)

== Statistics ==
=== Overview ===
Competition	Record							
Competition	P	W	D	L	GF	GA	GD	Win %
Championship	46	21	10	15	66	56	+10	45.65
Play-offs	3	2	1	0	5	2	+3	66.67
FA Cup	3	1	1	1	3	2	+1	33.33
League Cup	3	2	0	1	5	3	+2	66.67
Total	55	26	12	17	79	63	+16	47.27

=== Goalscorers ===
Rank	Pos	No.	Nat	Name	Championship	Play-offs	FA Cup	League Cup	Total
1	ST	10	(England)	Marlon Harewood	17	1	2	2	22
2	ST	8	(England)	Teddy Sheringham	20	0	1	0	21
3	ST	25	(England)	Bobby Zamora	7	4	0	2	13
4	MF	12	(England)	Matthew Etherington	4	0	0	0	4
5	MF	20	(England)	Nigel Reo-Coker	3	0	0	0	3
6	MF	6	(Wales)	Carl Fletcher	2	0	0	0	2
6	ST	16	(Ukraine)	Serhii Rebrov	1	0	0	1	2
6	DF	21	(Scotland)	Malky Mackay	2	0	0	0	2
6	Own goals				2	0	0	0	2
10	DF	3	(England)	Rufus Brevett	1	0	0	0	1
10	MF	11	(Northern Ireland)	Steve Lomas	1	0	0	0	1
10	DF	15	(England)	Anton Ferdinand	1	0	0	0	1
10	MF	17	(England)	Hayden Mullins	1	0	0	0	1
10	MF	19	(England)	Adam Nowland	1	0	0	0	1
10	DF	19	(England)	Darren Powell	1	0	0	0	1
10	MF	30	(England)	Luke Chadwick	1	0	0	0	1
10	MF	35	(Wales)	Gavin Williams	1	0	0	0	1
Totals					66	5	3	5	79

=== Appearances and goals ===
No.	Pos	Nat	Player	Total		Championship		Play-offs		FA Cup		League Cup	
No.	Pos	Nat	Player	Apps	Goals	Apps	Goals	Apps	Goals	Apps	Goals	Apps	Goals
Goalkeepers
1	GK	(England) ENG	Stephen Bywater	39	0	36	0	0+1	0	2	0	0	0
23	GK	(England) ENG	Jimmy Walker	17	0	10	0	3	0	1	0	3	0
Defenders
2	DF	(Czech Republic) CZE	Tomáš Řepka	51	0	42	0	3	0	3	0	3	0
3	DF	(England) ENG	Rufus Brevett	13	1	10	1	0	0	0	0	3	0
5	DF	(Wales) WAL	Andy Melville	4	0	3	0	0	0	0	0	0+1	0
7	DF	(Scotland) SCO	Christian Dailly	5	0	2+1	0	0+2	0	0	0	0	0
9	DF	(Argentina) ARG	Mauricio Taricco	1	0	1	0	0	0	0	0	0	0
14	DF	(England) ENG	Chris Cohen	14	0	1+10	0	0	0	0+1	0	1+1	0
15	DF	(England) ENG	Anton Ferdinand	36	1	24+5	1	3	0	3	0	1	0
19	DF	(England) ENG	Darren Powell	5	1	5	1	0	0	0	0	0	0
21	DF	(Scotland) SCO	Malky Mackay	22	2	17+1	2	0	0	3	0	1	0
22	DF	(England) ENG	Elliott Ward	15	0	10+1	0	3	0	0	0	1	0
26	DF	(England) ENG	Calum Davenport	10	0	10	0	0	0	0	0	0	0
28	DF	(England) ENG	Trent McClenahan	3	0	0+2	0	0	0	0	0	1	0
34	DF	(England) ENG	Chris Powell	42	0	35+1	0	3	0	3	0	0	0
Midfielders
4	MF	(Scotland) SCO	Don Hutchison	6	0	2+3	0	0	0	0	0	0+1	0
6	MF	(Wales) WAL	Carl Fletcher	36	2	26+6	2	1	0	3	0	0	0
9	MF	(Jamaica) JAM	Jobi McAnuff	1	0	0+1	0	0	0	0	0	0	0
11	MF	(Northern Ireland) NIR	Steve Lomas	25	1	18+5	1	0	0	0	0	2	0
12	MF	(England) ENG	Matthew Etherington	44	4	37+2	4	3	0	0	0	2	0
17	MF	(England) ENG	Hayden Mullins	45	1	32+5	1	3	0	2+1	0	2	0
19	MF	(England) ENG	Adam Nowland	6	1	3+1	1	0	0	0	0	2	0
20	MF	(England) ENG	Nigel Reo-Coker	47	3	34+5	3	3	0	1+1	0	3	0
24	MF	(England) ENG	Mark Noble	21	0	10+3	0	0+3	0	3	0	0+2	0
26	MF	(England) ENG	Shaun Newton	14	0	11	0	2+1	0	0	0	0	0
30	MF	(England) ENG	Luke Chadwick	36	1	22+10	1	0	0	3	0	1	0
35	MF	(Wales) WAL	Gavin Williams	10	1	7+3	1	0	0	0	0	0	0
Forwards
8	FW	(England) ENG	Teddy Sheringham	36	21	26+7	20	0	0	2	1	0+1	0
10	FW	(England) ENG	Marlon Harewood	54	22	45	17	3	1	3	2	3	2
16	FW	(Ukraine) UKR	Serhii Rebrov	32	2	12+14	1	0+1	0	1+1	0	2+1	1
21	FW	(Australia) AUS	Richard Garcia	1	0	0+1	0	0	0	0	0	0	0
25	FW	(England) ENG	Bobby Zamora	39	13	15+19	7	3	4	0	0	2	2
