= John Doyle Group =

British civil engineering contractor

- Type: Private company
- Industry: Building
- Founded: 1966
- Defunct: 12 June 2012
- Fate: Bankrupt
- Headquarters: Welwyn Garden City, United Kingdom
- Area served: United Kingdom
- Key people: Stef Stefanou (Chairman and part owner)
- Services: Specialist building contractor, refurbishment specialist
- Number of employees: 260 (2012)

John Doyle Group was a British civil engineering contractor, specialising in substructure, superstructure, basements and infrastructure works. The company went bankrupt in 2012.

Prior to its bankruptcy the company had an £80 million turnover and employed 260 people.

== History ==
The company was founded in 1966, and based in Welwyn Garden City, with other offices based in Warrington and Derby.

Civil engineer Stef Stefanou joined the company early on, and over time became its owner and chairman.

In 1999, Accord, a business, environmental, highways, housing and technical services was spun out and headed up by his brother Stelio Stefanou. On 21 September 2007, after eight years of growth, Accord was acquired by Enterprise plc for £180 million.

The John Doyle Group had several companies underneath it. Including John Doyle Construction, Blythewood Plant hire, Bell Projects, and Ibex Interiors. Ibex Interiors was a fit-out and refurbishment contractor based in London.

In 2006 A company management buy out (MBO) occurred, providing share options to staff.

On 12 June 2012, the administrators were called in and the company was declared bankrupt.
