= Andy Lonergan =

English footballer (born 1983)

Andrew Lonergan
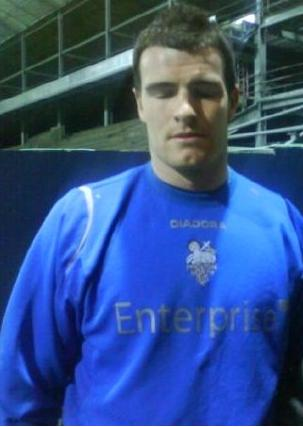
- Lonergan as a Preston North End player in 2010

Personal information
- Full name: Andrew Michael Lonergan
- Date of birth: 19 October 1983 (age 43)
- Place of birth: Preston, England
- Height: 6 ft 4 in (1.92 m)
- Position: Goalkeeper

Team information
- Current team: Liverpool Women (goalkeeping coach)

Youth career
- Blackburn Rovers
- Preston North End

Senior career*
| Years | Team | Apps | (Gls) |
| 2000–2011 | Preston North End | 208 | (1) |
| 2002 | → Darlington (loan) | 2 | (0) |
| 2003 | → Blackpool (loan) | 0 | (0) |
| 2005 | → Wycombe Wanderers (loan) | 2 | (0) |
| 2006 | → Swindon Town (loan) | 1 | (0) |
| 2011–2012 | Leeds United | 35 | (0) |
| 2012–2015 | Bolton Wanderers | 51 | (0) |
| 2015–2016 | Fulham | 29 | (0) |
| 2016–2017 | Wolverhampton Wanderers | 11 | (0) |
| 2017–2018 | Leeds United | 7 | (0) |
| 2018–2019 | Middlesbrough | 0 | (0) |
| 2019 | → Rochdale (loan) | 7 | (0) |
| 2019–2020 | Liverpool | 0 | (0) |
| 2020–2021 | Stoke City | 0 | (0) |
| 2021 | West Bromwich Albion | 0 | (0) |
| 2021–2024 | Everton | 0 | (0) |
| 2024–2025 | Wigan Athletic | 0 | (0) |
| Total | | 353 | (1) |

International career
| 2000 | Republic of Ireland U16 | 1 | (0) |
| 2002–2003 | England U20 | 10 | (0) |
- * Club domestic league appearances and goals

Andrew Michael Lonergan (born 19 October 1983) is an English professional football coach and former player who played as a goalkeeper. He is currently the goalkeeping coach of Women's Super League club Liverpool.

After starting his career at Preston North End, Lonergan soon established himself as a first-choice goalkeeper and won Preston's player of the year award in both the 2008–09 and 2009–10 seasons.

Lonergan is a former England U21 international and is also eligible to play for the Republic of Ireland.

== Career ==
=== Preston North End ===
Born in Preston, Lancashire, Lonergan grew up supporting Preston North End. Lonergan joined Blackburn Rovers' academy after they spotted him at a young age and beat off competition from Manchester United and Everton. His time at Blackburn Rovers was short–lived and he soon joined Preston North End, where he started his professional career. At age nine, Lonergan began taking interest in becoming a goalkeeper, a position he plays today.

After attending St. Cecilia's RC Technology College (now St. Cecilia's RC High School), Lonergan progressed through the Youth Training Scheme and was offered a professional terms by Preston North End in the 2000–01 season. Lonergan then made his Preston debut managed by David Moyes as a 16-year-old in a League Cup tie away at Coventry City. However, Lonergan made an impression on his debut despite conceding four goals, as Preston North End lost 4–1. Despite this, Lonergan went on to win the Young Player of the Year for the 2000–01 season.

With his progress being closely monitored by the goalkeeping coach, Peter Williams, he was sent out on loan to Darlington on 21 December 2002. After making his debut against Macclesfield Town on 21 December 2002 However, Lonergan's loan spell at Darlington ended after a week after picking up an injury. After recovering from an injury, Preston then sent him out on loan to rivals Blackpool.

With David Moyes leaving to join Everton and Craig Brown entering the managerial fray at Deepdale, Lonergan remained optimistic about his future at the club; indeed, he was promoted to the first-team squad for the final stage of the 2002–03 season as an understudy to Scotland international Jonathan Gould. With Gould out injured for a period of the following season, Lonergan snapped up his goalkeeping gloves and stood between the sticks for the first time in the league against West Brom, two years after his debut. Gould fell out of favour soon after, and Lonergan remained as the first choice until the end of that season. But this was short–lived when Lonergan lost his first team place after breaking his hand, resulting in him being out for six weeks and missing out for the rest of the season. After returning to training in the pre–season, Lonergan returned to the first team as first choice goalkeeper and on 2 October 2004 he scored a goal from his own penalty area in the 39th minute against Leicester City to equalise. His long kick bounced over Leicester goalkeeper Kevin Pressman after defender Matt Heath had let the ball bounce. The game ended in a 1–1 draw. He remained at Deepdale for the 2004–05 season under the watchful eye of new manager Billy Davies, and played a part in 65% of the season before he ruptured his cruciate ligaments before a game against Ipswich Town, due to Lonergan's injury, Carlo Nash was signed as a replacement by Billy Davies from Middlesbrough to shore up the goalkeeping crisis. It wasn't the first time Lonergan suffered an injury: he broke his hand during training.

After a long spell out injured with the injury it took Lonergan over two years to gain back his place. Nash kept his place for the 2005–06 term and kept a club record of over 30 clean sheets. Lonergan himself was injured in training early in 2005, and returned to training in early–September. As a result, Lonergan only returned to action with a loan spell to get himself match fit in late 2005 at Wycombe Wanderers. Lonergan made his Wycombe Wanderers debut on 7 October 2005, where he kept a clean sheet, in a 1–0 win over Grimsby Town and kept another clean sheet on his second appearance on 15 October 2005, in a 0–0 draw against Rushden & Diamonds. However, he returned to his parent club after injuring himself in training once again, due to a screw holding his ligament in place snapping. After returning to his parent club, Lonergan undergone surgery for the second time and was sidelined for eight months.

On 2 November 2006, Lonergan joined Swindon Town on a one-month loan contract to gain first-team football. He made his Swindon Town debut on 4 November 2006, in a 2–1 loss against Hereford United and was praised after the match. He returned early, however, after he wasn't given the football he desired under new Swindon Manager Paul Sturrock who had just replaced Dennis Wise.

After signing a three–year contract, keeping him until 2011, Lonergan returned to the Preston bench until January 2007, when Nash's unprofessional attitude meant a recall to the first team for Lonergan in an FA Cup Fourth round tie at Crystal Palace in which he impressed with a clean sheet in a 2–0 victory for Preston. Lonergan then made an impressive save in the local derby, in a 2–0 win over Burnley on 19 March 2007. Longeran went on to established himself as a first choice goalkeeper in the 2006–07 season and made thirteen appearances for the club.

In the 2007–08 season, Lonergan appeared as a substitute for the first three matches at the start of the season after Wayne Henderson became a first choice goalkeeper. Lonergan regained his first choice back following Henderson's injury and made his first appearance of the season, in a 2–1 loss against Coventry City on 1 September 2007. From that moment on, Lonergan made 43 appearances in the 2007–08 season and helped the club finish 15th in the Championship.

In the 2008–09 season, Lonergan continued to regain his first-choice goalkeeper status and played all 46 league matches throughout the season. Lonergan also helped the club finish sixth place in the league, qualifying for the Championship play–offs, but were unsuccessful. For his performance, Lonergan won Preston's 2008/09 player of the year award.

After Preston North End club captain, Paul McKenna was sold to Nottingham Forest in August 2009, Lonergan was made a vice-captain to new club captain, Callum Davidson. Lonergan's first match which he started as captain was at Deepdale, where he led Preston North End out to win 2–0 against Swansea City on 12 September 2009. Manager, Alan Irvine claimed that he believed Lonergan was good enough to play for England.

He had a fine season during the 2009–10 season, and won Preston's player of the year award. During the last few games of the season Preston managed to overcome an inferior goal difference to playoff rivals Cardiff City by beating them 6–0, with Lonergan also saving a penalty from Ross McCormack in the same game which in the end proved vital on goal difference for the final table result to overtake Cardiff and reach the playoffs. Lonergan played a big part in helping Preston reach the playoff Semi-finals during the 2009–10 season but lost over two legs to Sheffield United. During the summer Premier League club West Bromwich Albion had three separate bids rejected for Lonergan, with Preston manager Darren Ferguson claiming he valued Lonergan at £20 million and that he didn't want to sell him.

Lonergan was the goalkeeper for Preston during the 2010–11 season as they were relegated to League One making 29 league starts. In September 2010, Lonergan was charged for making obscene gestures to fierce-rivals Burnley's supporters during Preston's 4–3 loss. Lonergan was fined for the incident and warned of his future conduct. In the same month Lonergan also played in one of the games of the season in Preston's 6–4 win against Leeds United, with Preston coming back to win the game after being 4–1 down. He was linked with moves to Manchester City and Wigan Athletic in the January transfer window. Lonergan claimed in January that he was the most overworked goalkeeper in the Championship. However, during the last quarter of the season under new manager Phil Brown, Lonergan was displaced by Everton loan goalkeeper Iain Turner. Lonergan also spent time training with Everton as part of the loan deal for Turner. Lonergan was linked with a loan move to Blackpool during February on an emergency loan due to injuries to Paul Rachubka and Richard Kingson. Lonergan's last appearance for Preston came in Preston's 2–1 loss against Leeds United on 8 March 2011. After relegation from the Championship Lonergan was linked with moves to Cardiff City, and Everton. Manager, Phil Brown revealed he needed to sell Lonergan to re-sign loan goalkeeper Iain Turner due to lack of funds.

On 4 July 2011, Lonergan was linked with a move to join Leeds United in order to replace Kasper Schmeichel and Shane Higgs who had both left the club. Everton also entered the race to sign Lonergan.

Preston North End manager Phil Brown confirmed in early July 2011 that Andy Lonergan was set to sign for Leeds United, live on Talksport. Sky Sports reported 25 July that Lonergan was set to sign for Leeds United, after the move was originally put on hold for both parties as Leeds became interested in signing David Stockdale and Lonergan was interesting Premier League club Everton. Lonergan's daughter was also in hospital at this time delaying the move further. In total Lonergan made 231 appearances during his career at Preston North End.

=== Leeds United ===
On 25 July 2011, Lonergan signed for Leeds United on a three-year contract for an undisclosed fee. He competed with fellow new goalkeeper signing Paul Rachubka for the number one spot left vacant by the departed Kasper Schmeichel. Lonergan was briefly a teammate of then Leeds United manager Simon Grayson during a short loan spell at Blackpool in 2003. Lonergan made his first appearance in a Leeds shirt in the pre-season victory against Newcastle United. Lonergan was given the number 1 shirt for the forthcoming season.

On the opening day of the season, Lonergan made his debut for Leeds in the 3–1 defeat against Southampton. Lonergan received the man of the match award in Leeds' 1–0 loss against Middlesbrough on 14 August. Lonergan started his fourth game of the season against Hull City at Elland Road where he put in another good performance making saves to deny Hull City as Leeds United won 4–1. After some good performances for Leeds in his first couple of months at the club, Lonergan revealed that the move to Leeds had worked out "brilliantly" for him. Lonergan made some crucial saves for Leeds to help earn them a 3–2 victory against Crystal Palace on 10 September. Lonergan saved a penalty from Nicky Maynard on 17 September against Bristol City to help Leeds earn a 2–1 victory. Lonergan got his first clean sheet of the season against Portsmouth on 1 October, with Lonergan again making some crucial saves. After keeping a consecutive clean sheet, Lonergan was substituted in the second half against Doncaster Rovers after fracturing his finger and replaced by Paul Rachubka on 14 October. Lonergan missed the game against Coventry City with the finger injury on 18 October and was replaced by understudy Paul Rachubka. After the game manager Simon Grayson revealed Lonergan had surgery on the finger and would be ruled out for a minimum of six weeks.

After returning from injury, Lonergan was on Leeds' bench against Watford on 10 December, due to the impressive form of loanee Alex McCarthy. With McCarthy ineligible against his parent club Reading on 17 December, Lonergan came back into Leeds starting line-up. Leeds lost the game 1–0, with Lonergan feeling he was culpable for the goal conceded.

Lonergan was revealed as Leeds' new captain on 20 January, replacing the departing captain Jonny Howson, with Patrick Kisnorbo out until the end of the season. Lonergan was replaced as Captain by Robert Snodgrass, who was appointed the new Leeds United captain by new Leeds manager Neil Warnock in his first game in charge against Portsmouth on 25 February. After a string of clean sheets, Lonergan conceded seven goals in a 3–7 loss against Nottingham Forest. Lonergan saved a penalty against Millwall's Darius Henderson in the following game to earn Leeds a crucial 1–0 victory.

After the season finished, Leeds signed Q.P.R. goalkeeper Paddy Kenny to be the new number one at the club. On 12 July, Leeds confirmed that they had rejected a bid for Lonergan from an unnamed club as they deemed the offer 'not acceptable'. With Lonergan losing his first team place, Bolton Wanderers manager Owen Coyle confirmed his interest in signing Lonergan.

=== Bolton Wanderers ===
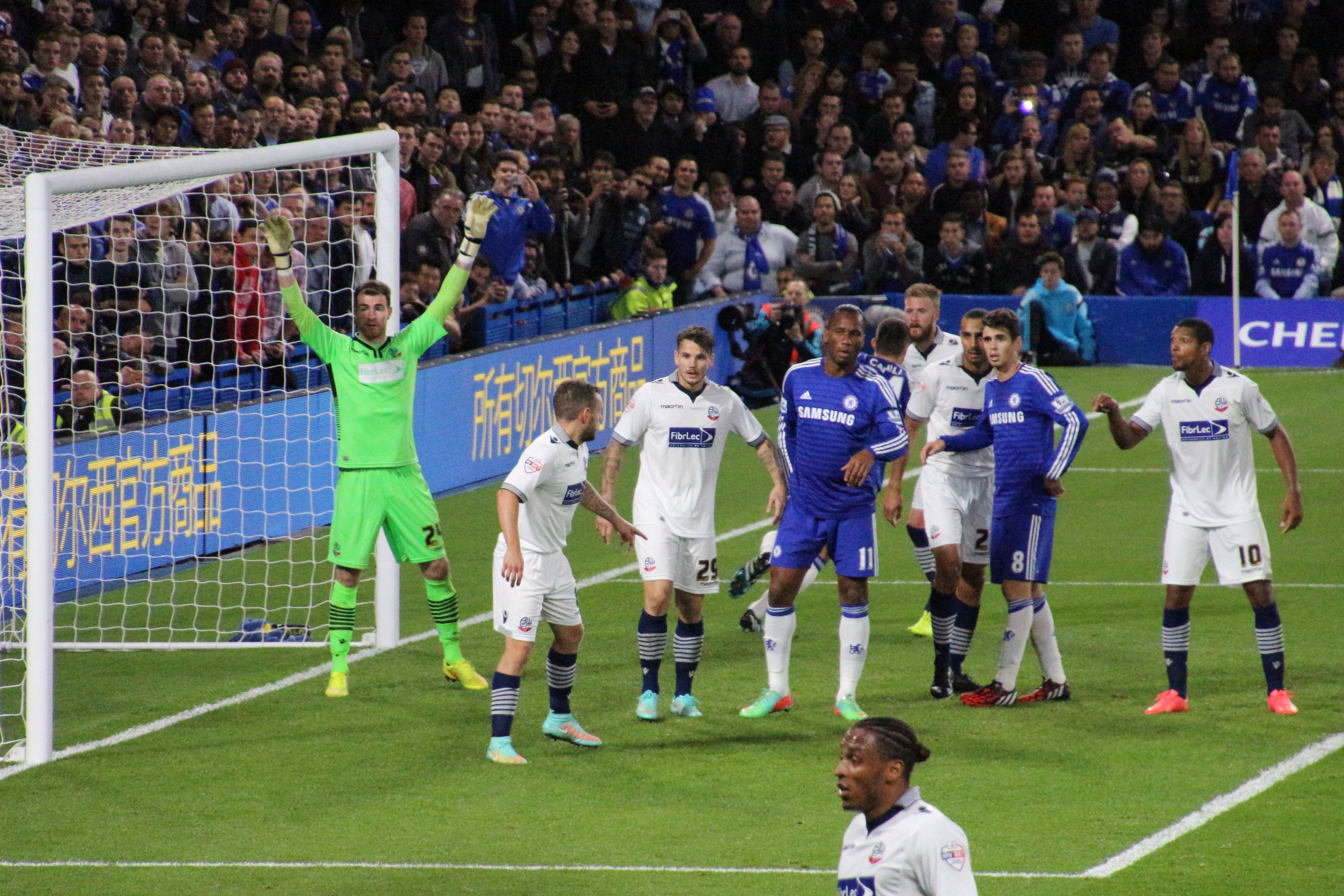
Lonergan (wearing green) defending a corner kick, for Bolton Wanderers against Chelsea in 2014

On 17 July 2012, Bolton Wanderers confirmed the signing of Lonergan on a three-year deal for an undisclosed fee. Upon joining the club, Lonergan spoke about the challenge he was expecting to face at Bolton Wanderers.

His debut came on 28 August 2012 in a 2–1 defeat against Crawley Town in the League Cup second round. However, Lonergan found himself competing with Ádám Bogdán over the first choice goalkeeper spot. On 19 October 2012, Lonergan suffered a knee injury, which he sustained in training and was sidelined for two months. Lonergan's first experience in front of the Reebok Stadium crowd was the 2–2 draw between Wanderers and Sunderland in which he was named Man of the Match for Wanderers following appreciation of his contribution following saves from Steven Fletcher on 5 January 2013 and played against them in the FA Cup third round replay on 15 January 2013, where he kept a clean sheet, in a 2–0 win to send them through to the next round. Lonergan's first league game for Bolton came on 5 March 2013, as Bolton beat local rivals Blackburn Rovers by a single goal. Lonergan made four more appearances and kept two more clean sheets before Bogdán returned from injury and went on to make eleven appearances in all competitions.

In the 2013–14 season, Lonergan continued to compete the first choice goalkeeper status with Bogdán, but was given an opportunity to make his first appearance of the season on 26 October 2013, in a 1–1 draw against Ipswich Town following Bogdán's injury. After the match, Lonergan said he was happy to make his first appearance of the season.

From that moment on, Lonergan had become a first choice goalkeeper for the club from October to February. He soon became at fault when he conceded five goals, in a 5–3 loss against Leicester City on 29 December 2013 and was even at fault further when he conceded ten goals in three matches against Reading, Queens Park Rangers and Ipswich Town. Despite being reassured by manager Dougie Freedman that he would remain the first choice goalkeeper, Lonergan lost his first choice goalkeeper status to Bogdán and was on the substitute bench for the rest of the season until returning in goal, in a 2–2 draw against Birmingham City, which helped them survive relegation. Lonergan went on to finish the 2013–14 season, making twenty–three appearances in all competition.

In the 2014–15 season, Lonergan made his first appearance of the season, but conceded three goals, in a 3–0 loss against Watford in the opening game of the season. By the August, the club had rotate both Lonergan and Bogdán over the first choice goalkeeper role before Lonergan won the role and was the first choice goalkeeper for most of the season, due to Bogdán's injury. On 25 October 2014, Lonergan provided an assist for Craig Davies to score the third goal of the game, in a 3–1 win over Brentford. Throughout December saw Lonergan making an impression, as he kept three clean sheets and won the Bolton Wanderers Player of the Month award for December. Lonergan remained the first choice goalkeeper until he suffered a concussion after in the 65th minute and was substituted as a result, in a 4–1 loss against Nottingham Forest on 21 February 2015 and said the concussion he sustained could have ended his career. Despite being cleared from a serious injury after a scan, Lonergan lost his first choice goalkeeper status role following the arrival of Ben Amos and spent the rest of the season on the substitute bench. Lonergan finished the 2014–15 season, making thirty–two appearances in all competitions.

On 10 June 2015, it was announced that Lonergan would leave the club upon the expiry of his contract. During the match at Bolton Wanderers, Lonergan earned a cult status among Bolton Wanderers supporters and while playing, the supporters would chant for him to the tune of Simon and Garfunkel's Mrs Robinson: "And here's to you Andy Lonergan, Bolton loves you more than you will know..."

=== Fulham ===
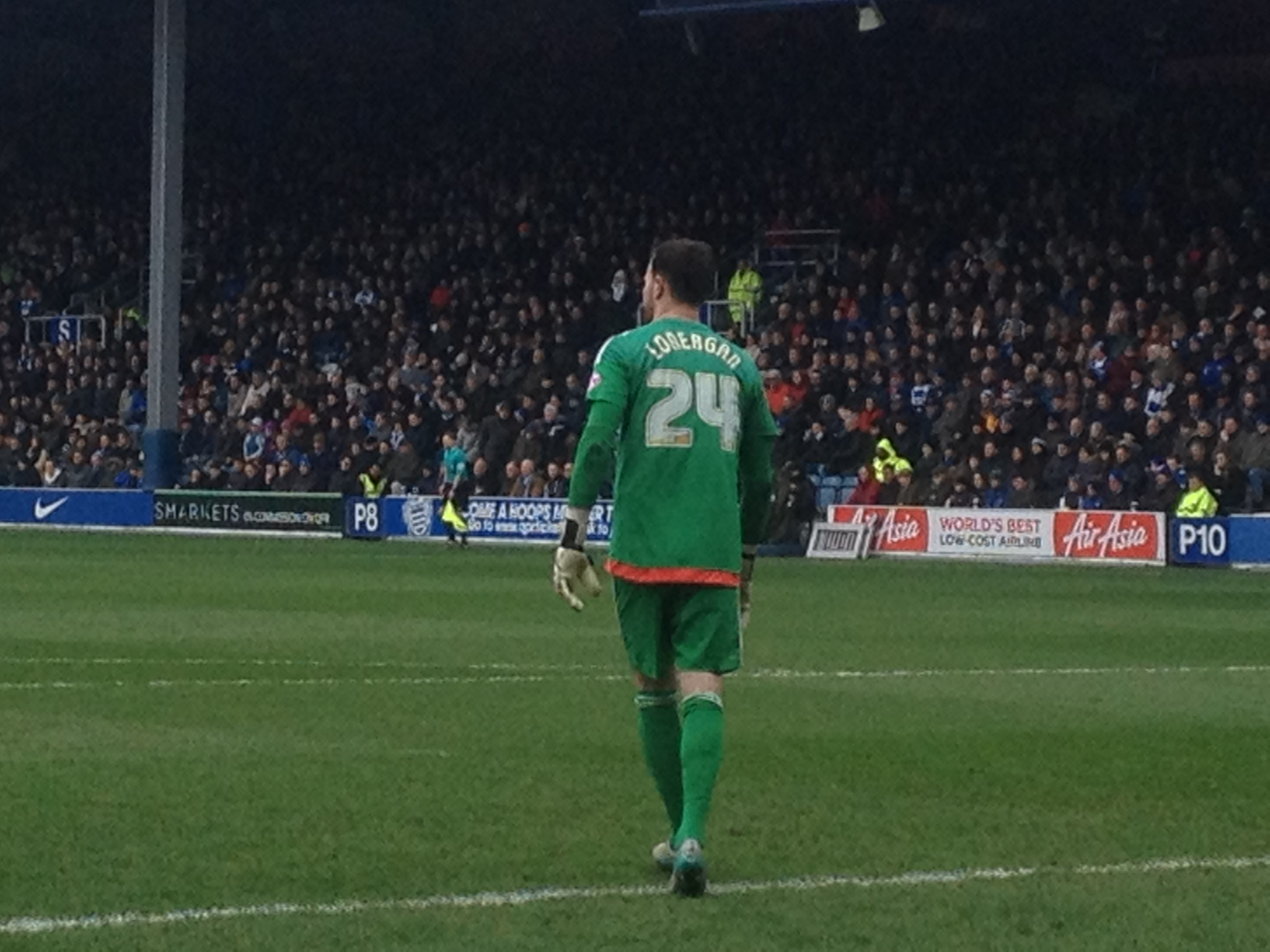
Lonergan playing for Fulham against Queen's Park Rangers in 2016

On 19 June 2015, Lonergan returned to the Championship, signing for Fulham on a two-year deal with a one-year extension option after his release from Bolton Wanderers. He was allocated the number 24 shirt.

Lonergan made his Fulham debut, making his first start, in the opening game of the season, in a 1–1 draw against Cardiff City. After Marcus Bettinelli suffered an injury in a game against Hull City on 20 August 2015 and was stretchered off in the 45th minute, Lonergan came on as a substitute after Marcus Bettinelli collided with Matt Smith and Fulham went on to lose 2–1. In a 2–1 win over Blackburn Rovers on 13 September 2015, Lonergan was named the Man of the Match following a string of impressive saves. He became the first choice goalkeeper for the club until he suffered a hamstring injury, sustained during a 2–1 loss against Bristol City on 31 October 2015, and was out for six weeks. Lonergan made his first team return on 12 December 2015, in a 2–2 draw against Brentford and despite a draw, he was once again named Man of the Match for his impressive display and again for the third time, in a 1–0 loss against Sheffield Wednesday on 4 January 2016. Lonergan remained the first choice goalkeeper until Bettinelli returned from injury and he was placed on the substitute bench for the rest of the season.

=== Wolverhampton Wanderers ===
On 9 June 2016, Lonergan joined Wolverhampton Wanderers from Fulham on a two-year deal with a one-year extension option. He was allocated the number 21 shirt.

He made his first ever appearance for the club on 15 July 2016, coming on as a half-time substitute for Carl Ikeme in a 2–0 win over Crewe Alexandra at Gresty Road, assisting Joe Mason for the second goal. Lonergan's first competitive appearance for Wolves came on 9 August, in a 2–1 League Cup First Round win over Crawley Town at Molineux. On 28 January 2017, with Ikeme suspended, Lonergan missed Wanderers' fourth-round FA Cup tie at Liverpool due to injury.

After the emergence of Harry Burgoyne and the signings of goalkeepers Will Norris and John Ruddy, Lonergan was not allocated a squad number for the 2017/18 season, despite Ikeme being out due to illness.

As of September 2023, he is the only player to appear in the Football League for all three clubs with the suffix Wanderers; Wycombe, Bolton and Wolverhampton.

=== Return to Leeds United ===
In August 2017, after Leeds released Robert Green, the club re-signed Lonergan on a two-year contract on a free transfer from Wolverhampton Wanderers. He made his second debut for Leeds in a League Cup tie against Premier League side Burnley the following month, with Lonergan proving to be the match winner with a penalty save from James Tarkowski in Leeds' penalty shoot-out victory after a 2–2 draw. A deal was agreed for him to join Sunderland on loan in January 2018, but Lonergan decided to stay at Leeds and fight for his place in the team. That July, after being deemed surplus to requirements by new manager Marcelo Bielsa, Lonergan left Leeds by mutual consent.

=== Middlesbrough ===
Lonergan signed a one-year contract with Championship club Middlesbrough in August 2018. In February 2019 he joined League One side Rochdale on an emergency loan, and was released by Middlesbrough at the end of the 2018–19 season.

=== Liverpool ===
In July 2019 Lonergan joined Liverpool on their pre-season tour of the US to provide back-up due to a shortage of goalkeepers, starting for Liverpool against Sevilla at Fenway Park, Boston. After an injury to Liverpool's first choice goalkeeper Alisson Becker, Lonergan signed short-term contract with the club in August 2019. He was an unused substitute as Liverpool won the 2019 UEFA Super Cup and the FIFA Club World Cup, and was released by Liverpool at the end of the 2019–20 season.

=== Stoke City ===
In December 2020 Lonergan signed a short-term contract with Stoke City to act as cover and competition for Josef Bursik, following injuries to first choice keeper Adam Davies, recent loan signing Angus Gunn, and Niki Mäenpää, who had also recently signed on a short-term deal. He played in a 3–1 EFL Cup quarter final defeat against Tottenham Hotspur on 23 December 2020.

=== West Bromwich Albion ===
On 9 January 2021, Lonergan signed a short-term contract with Premier League club West Bromwich Albion.

=== Everton ===
On 20 August 2021, Lonergan joined Premier League side Everton on a deal until the end of the season. On 11 July 2022, Lonergan signed a new 1-year deal to keep him at the club until 2023. At the end of the 2023 season Lonergan agreed to extend his stay at Everton for a further season.

On 17 May 2024, the club said he would be leaving in the summer when his contract expired.

=== Wigan Athletic ===
In June 2024, Lonergan joined League One side Wigan Athletic on a free transfer, signing a player-coach role with the club.

On 9 May 2025, Wigan announced the player would be leaving the club in June when his contract expired.

== International career ==
Lonergan is eligible to play for England and the Republic of Ireland. In 2000, Lonergan was called up by England U17, but had to withdraw from the squad because at the time, he was studying for his GCSEs. Lonergan revealed that his international commitment to England resulted in him missing out of school a lot.

After playing just one game for the Republic of Ireland's U16s, Lonergan decided to play for the country of his birth England. He was called up to represent England's U-21 team for the first time in February 2004. He also played for England in the Under 20 World Cup. He is also eligible to play for the Republic of Ireland national team due to his Irish grandparents.

Due to a change in FIFA rulings Lonergan became eligible for the Republic of Ireland, with the keeper on Giovanni Trapattoni's radar for the squad. Former Preston teammate and Republic of Ireland international Sean St. Ledger also championed Lonergan getting a call up to the Ireland squad. In May 2010, Lonergan revealed he would welcome a call up to the Republic of Ireland national team after he had initially refused an enquiry to be called up to the Irish squad.

== Personal life ==
Lonergan attended St. Cecilia's RC Technology College (now St. Cecilia's RC High School). He has two daughters, one of whom suffers from Phenylketonuria.

== Career statistics ==
As of match played 23 December 2020

Appearances and goals by club, season and competition
| Club | Season | League | | | FA Cup | | League Cup | | Other | | Total | |
| Club | Season | Division | Apps | Goals | Apps | Goals | Apps | Goals | Apps | Goals | Apps | Goals |
|---|---|---|---|---|---|---|---|---|---|---|---|---|
| Preston North End | 2000–01 | First Division | 1 | 0 | 0 | 0 | 1 | 0 | 0 | 0 | 2 | 0 |
| Preston North End | 2001–02 | First Division | 0 | 0 | 0 | 0 | 0 | 0 | 0 | 0 | 0 | 0 |
| Preston North End | 2002–03 | First Division | 0 | 0 | 0 | 0 | 0 | 0 | 0 | 0 | 0 | 0 |
| Preston North End | 2003–04 | First Division | 8 | 0 | 0 | 0 | 0 | 0 | 0 | 0 | 8 | 0 |
| Preston North End | 2004–05 | Championship | 23 | 1 | 1 | 0 | 2 | 0 | 0 | 0 | 26 | 1 |
| Preston North End | 2005–06 | Championship | 0 | 0 | 0 | 0 | 0 | 0 | 0 | 0 | 0 | 0 |
| Preston North End | 2006–07 | Championship | 13 | 0 | 2 | 0 | 0 | 0 | 0 | 0 | 15 | 0 |
| Preston North End | 2007–08 | Championship | 43 | 0 | 3 | 0 | 0 | 0 | 0 | 0 | 46 | 0 |
| Preston North End | 2008–09 | Championship | 46 | 0 | 1 | 0 | 2 | 0 | 2 (Note: Appearances in the Championship play-offs) | 0 | 51 | 0 |
| Preston North End | 2009–10 | Championship | 45 | 0 | 2 | 0 | 3 | 0 | 0 | 0 | 50 | 0 |
| Preston North End | 2010–11 | Championship | 29 | 0 | 1 | 0 | 3 | 0 | 0 | 0 | 33 | 0 |
| Preston North End | Total | | 208 | 1 | 10 | 0 | 11 | 0 | 2 | 0 | 231 | 1 |
| Darlington (loan) | 2002–03 | Third Division | 2 | 0 | 0 | 0 | 0 | 0 | 0 | 0 | 2 | 0 |
| Blackpool (loan) | 2002–03 | Second Division | 0 | 0 | 0 | 0 | 0 | 0 | 0 | 0 | 0 | 0 |
| Wycombe Wanderers (loan) | 2005–06 | League Two | 2 | 0 | 0 | 0 | 0 | 0 | 0 | 0 | 2 | 0 |
| Swindon Town (loan) | 2006–07 | League Two | 1 | 0 | 0 | 0 | 0 | 0 | 0 | 0 | 1 | 0 |
| Leeds United | 2011–12 | Championship | 35 | 0 | 1 | 0 | 2 | 0 | 0 | 0 | 38 | 0 |
| Bolton Wanderers | 2012–13 | Championship | 5 | 0 | 3 | 0 | 1 | 0 | 0 | 0 | 9 | 0 |
| Bolton Wanderers | 2013–14 | Championship | 17 | 0 | 2 | 0 | 2 | 0 | 0 | 0 | 21 | 0 |
| Bolton Wanderers | 2014–15 | Championship | 29 | 0 | 1 | 0 | 2 | 0 | 0 | 0 | 32 | 0 |
| Bolton Wanderers | Total | | 51 | 0 | 6 | 0 | 5 | 0 | 0 | 0 | 62 | 0 |
| Fulham | 2015–16 | Championship | 29 | 0 | 1 | 0 | 1 | 0 | 0 | 0 | 31 | 0 |
| Wolverhampton Wanderers | 2016–17 | Championship | 11 | 0 | 0 | 0 | 3 | 0 | 0 | 0 | 14 | 0 |
| Wolverhampton Wanderers U21 | 2016–17 | — | | | — | | — | | 1 (Note: Appearance in the EFL Trophy) | 0 | 1 | 0 |
| Leeds United | 2017–18 | Championship | 7 | 0 | 1 | 0 | 1 | 0 | 0 | 0 | 9 | 0 |
| Middlesbrough | 2018–19 | Championship | 0 | 0 | 0 | 0 | 2 | 0 | 0 | 0 | 2 | 0 |
| Middlesbrough U21 | 2018–19 | — | | | — | | — | | 2 | 0 | 2 | 0 |
| Rochdale (loan) | 2018–19 | League One | 7 | 0 | 0 | 0 | 0 | 0 | 0 | 0 | 7 | 0 |
| Liverpool | 2019–20 | Premier League | 0 | 0 | 0 | 0 | 0 | 0 | 0 | 0 | 0 | 0 |
| Stoke City | 2020–21 | Championship | 0 | 0 | 0 | 0 | 1 | 0 | — | | 1 | 0 |
| West Bromwich Albion | 2020–21 | Premier League | 0 | 0 | 0 | 0 | — | | — | | 0 | 0 |
| Everton | 2021–22 | Premier League | 0 | 0 | 0 | 0 | 0 | 0 | — | | 0 | 0 |
| Everton | 2022–23 | Premier League | 0 | 0 | 0 | 0 | 0 | 0 | — | | 0 | 0 |
| Everton | 2023–24 | Premier League | 0 | 0 | 0 | 0 | 0 | 0 | — | | 0 | 0 |
| Everton | Total | | 0 | 0 | 0 | 0 | 0 | 0 | 0 | 0 | 0 | 0 |
| Wigan Athletic | 2024–25 | League One | 0 | 0 | 0 | 0 | 0 | 0 | 0 | 0 | 0 | 0 |
| Career total | | | 353 | 1 | 19 | 0 | 26 | 0 | 5 | 0 | 403 | 1 |

== Honours ==
Liverpool

- UEFA Super Cup: 2019
- FIFA Club World Cup: 2019

Individual

- Preston North End Fans' Player of the Year: 2008–09, 2009–10
- Preston North End Player's Player of the Year: 2009–10
- Preston North End Young Player of the Year: 2000–01
