= Stef Stefanou =

- Born: 23 September 1941 (age 84); Cairo, Egypt
- Known for: Owner & Chairman of John Doyle Group
- Relatives: Stelio Stefanou (brother)

Stefanos Stefanou OBE (born 23 September 1941) is a British civil engineer and businessman, who was born in Egypt to Cypriot parents.

== Early life ==
Stef was born in Egypt in 1941, the son of a shopkeeper who had emigrated from Cyprus, aged 14. The whole family left Egypt for the UK in 1959, following the political turmoil after the Suez crisis, which left his father unemployed.

== Career ==
He started his career with Peter Lind, Fairweather and Holst (now known as Vinci SA), before joining John Doyle Group in 1972.

Stefanou joined John Doyle Group six years after it was founded in 1966, and within three years was its managing director. Over time became its owner and chairman.

In 1999, Accord, a business, environmental, highways, housing and technical services was spun out from John Doyle Group and headed up by his brother Stelio Stefanou. On 21 September 2007, after eight years of growth, Accord was acquired by Enterprise plc for £180 million.

In 2002, Stef challenged the academic world to produce graduates that were fit for purpose and conceived the idea of Constructionarium (www.constructionarium.co.uk) where students build scaled projects of iconic structures from around the world. This has grown from strength to strength with, in 2018, over 23 academic institutes attending. The 6-day experiential learning event has seen over 1200 students benefit from the unique learning activity and enables the "theory to be turned into practice".

On the 12 June 2012, the administrators were called in. John Doyle Group had an £80 million turnover and employed 260 people.

== Honours ==
In 2004, he was made a FICE and in 2007, the OBE and an honorary doctorate by the University of Westminster.
