= Stelio Stefanou =

British businessman

- Born: 6 November 1952 (age 73); Egypt
- Education: Imperial College London
- Occupations: Businessman, philanthropist
- Known for: Founder of Accord company and The Stefanou Foundation
- Spouse: Rosemary Gordon (m. 1974; div. 2003) Susie Omer (m. 2008)
- Relatives: Stef Stefanou (brother)

Stelio Haralambos Stefanou OBE DL (born 6 November 1952) is a British businessman and philanthropist, who was born in Egypt to Cypriot parents.

He founded a public services and building maintenance company, Accord, which grew to employ 4000 people. He sold Accord for £147 million in 2007. He then founded two charities: the Stefanou Foundation in England, and the Stefanou Foundation Cyprus.

He is a Deputy Lieutenant of Hertfordshire, and he was High Sheriff in 2016/17 having been inaugurated on 2 April 2016 at County Hall, Hertford. According to the Sunday Times, his net worth in 2015 was £140 million.

== Early life and business career ==
Stefanou was born in Egypt, the son of a shopkeeper who had emigrated from Cyprus at age 14. The whole family left Egypt for the UK in 1959, following the political turmoil after the Suez Crisis, which lost his family their business. His parents reestablished themselves by starting a grocery shop in Battersea Stefanou arrived in the UK at age 6.

He studied chemistry at Imperial College London, graduating with a BSc. He started his industrial career working for Johnson Matthey (1974-1977) and Esso (1977-1980), before moving to John Doyle Construction in 1980.

Stefanou's brother Stef Stefanou also worked at John Doyle Group, and by 1999 Stef was the Chairman and Stelio was the Chief Executive. In 1999 they instigated a de-merger which split the company into two. Stef Stefanou retained John Doyle as the construction company, while Stelio Stefanou founded Accord as a separate company to run the longer-term public services and infrastructure maintenance contracts. Stefanou sold Accord to Enterprise plc in 2007.

== Public service ==
After selling Accord, Stefanou changed from running businesses to running charities. In 2008 he established the Stefanou Foundation to protect the interests of vulnerable people, especially the very young and the very old, and to support the commercial development of scientific ideas into viable businesses. He serves as its chairman. In 2013, he established the Stefanou Foundation Cyprus which aims to address social and economic challenges after the 2012–2013 Cypriot financial crisis, and he serves as its chairman.

In April 2015, he launched the "Healthy Relationships: Healthy Baby" (HRHB) programme for families suffering domestic abuse that are expecting babies. Parents join this program during pregnancy and they are supported to bring an end to domestic abuse in order to nurture their baby’s early development. The Foundation is initially running two prototype projects, in Hertfordshire and in Westminster. The police and crime commissioner for Hertfordshire, David Lloyd, visited the centre and he said he believes it can "reduce the number of people suffering from abuse and make society better and safer". Stefanou personally funds the development and initial delivery of the HRHB programme as part of his overall funding to the Stefanou Foundation of £1.5M a year.

Stefanou is a patron of Hertfordshire Action on Disability, and he is the Chairman of Trustees of the WAVE Trust, a charity that is dedicated to reducing interpersonal violence, child neglect and maltreatment.

He is a Deputy Lieutenant of Hertfordshire, initially appointed in January 2011, and was High Sheriff of Hertfordshire for the year 2016/2017.

Stefanou is vice-chairman of the UK-Cyprus Enterprise Council, which was established in 2013 to promote investment in Cyprus and bilateral trade with the UK.

== Honours ==
Stefanou was awarded an "Officer of the Order of the British Empire" (OBE) in 2004 for services to business. He has held roles in the Confederation of British Industry including Chairman of the Eastern Regional Council (1995-1997) and Chairman of their Local Government Panel (1997-2007). He is a Freeman of the City of London (1994). He was awarded the honorary degrees of Hon DLitt by the University of Westminster in 2007 and Hon LLD by the University of Hertfordshire in 2013.

== Personal life ==
In 2008, Stefanou married Susie Omer. She is also a Trustee of the Stefanou Foundation. Stefanou and his previous wife Rosemary Gordon were married for 22 years before separating in 1996; they divorced in 2003.
