= Darren Blewitt =

English footballer

Personal information
- Date of birth: 3 September 1985 (age 41)
- Place of birth: East Ham, England
- Height: 6 ft 2 in (1.88 m)
- Position: Defender

Youth career
- 19xx–1997: Norwich City
- 1997–2003: West Ham United

Senior career*
Years	Team	Apps	(Gls)
2003–2006	West Ham United	0	(0)
2005	→ Southend United (loan)	1	(0)
2005	→ Hereford United (loan)	11	(0)
2006–2008	Billericay Town		
2008	Heybridge Swifts		
2008	Enfield Town		
2008–2009	Brentwood Town		
2009	Aveley		
2009–2013	Brentwood Town		
2013–2014	Harlow Town	35	(2)
- * Club domestic league appearances and goals as of 18:23, 24 August 2017 (UTC)

Darren Blewitt (born 3 September 1985) is an English former footballer who played in the Football League for Southend United as a defender.

== Career ==
As a youngster, Blewitt was associated with Norwich City, but joined West Ham United while still at school and came through their academy system. He played regularly for and captained the reserves, and was an unused substitute for the first team. In February 2005 Blewitt joined Football League Two club Southend United on loan to gain experience of first-team football. However, his debut in the Football League was also the only appearance he made in Southend's first team, as an 89th-minute substitute in a 3–0 win away to Cheltenham Town. Blewitt spent the first half of the 2005–06 season on loan at Conference club Hereford United where he made eleven appearances, and had a trial with Oxford United in February 2006. West Ham released Blewitt at the end of that season.

After a trial with Dagenham & Redbridge, Blewitt joined Billericay Town, where he spent two seasons before being released and joining Heybridge Swifts. His stay was brief: he left following a change of management, made one appearance for Enfield Town, then, in September 2008, joined Brentwood Town, where he won both Manager's and Players' Player of the Year awards for the 2008–09 season. After Brentwood dismissed manager Carl Griffiths at the start of the 2009–10 season, Blewitt moved to Aveley. He then re-signed for Brentwood in November 2009.

On 28 March 2016, Blewitt played in former West Ham United teammate Mark Noble's testimonial at the Boleyn Ground.
