= Eusebius A. Stephanou =

Eusebius A. Stephanou (born Papastephanou; June 15, 1924 – May 23, 2016) was an American priest of the Greek Orthodox Archdiocese of America and one of the main leaders in the "Orthodox Renewal and Evangelism" movement, connected to the Charismatic movement.

== Biography ==
He was born in Fond du Lac, Wisconsin to Fr Alexander and Marika Papastephanou. Baptized with the name Agamemnon, Stephanou lived as a child in Detroit, Michigan and Lorain, Ohio where his father served as priest in the local Greek Orthodox Church.

In 1942, Stephanou entered Holy Cross Greek Orthodox Seminary, then located in Pomfret Center, Connecticut. Holy Cross relocated to Brookline, Massachusetts in 1946, Stephanou's senior year. In 1950 he was tonsured a monk in Cleveland, Ohio receiving the name Eusebius. At this time he also shortened his name from "Papastephanou" to Stephanou.

On September 17, 1950 Stephanou was ordained a Deacon at St. Constantine & Helen Greek Orthodox Church in Detroit. In 1951, he travelled to Greece to study at the University of Athens. On February 10, 1953 Stephanou was ordained to the priesthood in his father's hometown of Philiatra.

Stephanou later became involved in the Charismatic movement, gaining popularity in ecumenical circles. His interactions with Pentecostals led to his experiencing the baptism of the Holy Spirit in 1968, and later promoting it among the Orthodox as the "Orthodox Renewal and Evangelism" movement.

Stephanou was criticized by many Orthodox leaders and was later prevented from parish ministry by his bishop. In 1986, his superiors attempted to have him defrocked, but were unsuccessful. He returned to ministry in 1987.

Stephanou died in Florida on May 23, 2016. His funeral took place at Saints Markella and Demetrios Greek Orthodox Church in Mary Esther, Florida.
