= Accord (company) =

Accord plc
- Formerly: Accord Operations
- Type: Public
- Industry: Support services
- Founded: 1999
- Defunct: 2007
- Fate: Acquired
- Successor: Enterprise plc
- Headquarters: Welwyn Garden City, UK
- Number of locations: 50 offices
- Key people: Stelio Stefanou, (Chairman)
- Number of employees: 3,000 (2007)

Accord plc, previously Accord Operations, was a public services provider based in Hertfordshire, England.

== History ==
Accord was established by Stelio Stefanou in 1999 by a demerger of the John Doyle Group. On 21 September 2007, after eight years of growth, the company was acquired by Enterprise plc for £180m.

== Operations ==
Company services included business, environmental, highways, housing and technical services mainly for local authorities. The company had some 50 offices and employed 3,000 people. It undertook the entire facilities management service for Westminster City Council.
