= Chris Sedgwick =

English footballer (born 1980)

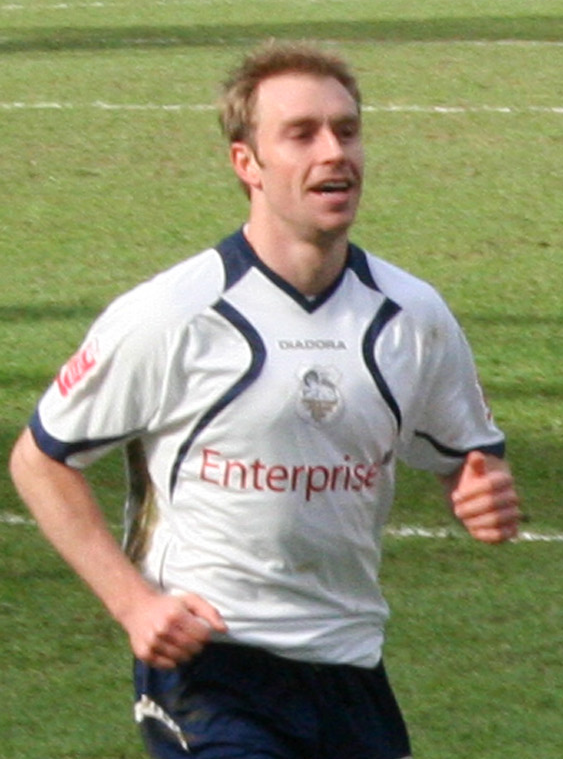
- Sedgwick playing for Preston North End in 2008

Personal information
- Full name: Christopher Edward Sedgwick
- Date of birth: 28 April 1980 (age 46)
- Place of birth: Sheffield, England
- Height: 5 ft 11 in (1.80 m)
- Position: Midfielder

Youth career
- –1997: Rotherham United

Senior career*
Years	Team	Apps	(Gls)
1997–2004	Rotherham United	245	(16)
2004–2010	Preston North End	229	(12)
2010–2012	Sheffield Wednesday	43	(5)
2012–2013	Scunthorpe United	4	(0)
2012–2013	→ Hyde (loan)	5	(1)
2013	Hyde	13	(0)
2013–2016	Bury	58	(2)
Total		597	(36)
- * Club domestic league appearances and goals

Christopher Edward Sedgwick (born 28 April 1980) is an English former professional footballer who played as a midfielder. He was last employed as a coach at Bury, the club with whom he spent the final three years of his playing career.

== Career ==
=== Rotherham United ===
Born in Sheffield, Sedgwick began his career as a right midfielder at Rotherham United, where he was affectionately known as the Yorkshire Express, and made over 250 first team appearances in a seven-year stint at the Yorkshire club. During that time he earned a reputation as an honest hard-working right-midfielder with good distribution skills. He was often regarded as the talisman of the club because of his Sheffield upbringing and passion for the club.

=== Preston North End ===
He signed for Preston North End for £400,000 in November 2004. At Preston, Sedgwick started to fulfill his potential as a right midfielder under Billy Davies and was an integral part of the side that would reach the playoff final in May 2005 and semi-finals in 2006. The departure of Davies in the summer of 2006 affected the certainty of Sedgwick's place in the team and he lost his place in the starting XI to Simon Whaley as new manager Paul Simpson took charge. At the beginning of the 2006–07 season, Sedgwick was asked to play in central midfield, a new position for the winger, as cover for Brian O'Neil who was struggling with injury before being forced to retire. There he formed a partnership with Paul McKenna as Simpson's side picked up where Billy Davies left off, ending 2006 top of the 1st Division before finishing the season in 7th, a point off the playoffs.

Preston's poor start to the 2007/8 season and Whaley's indifferent form saw Sedgwick in and out of the Preston side until Simpson was dismissed in November 2007. Under Simpson's replacement Alan Irvine, Sedgwick's undeniable work ethic saw him one of the first names on Irvine's team sheet as Preston survived relegation in 2008 and again reached the playoff semi-finals in 2009.

However, when Irvine was replaced in December 2009 by Darren Ferguson and Preston's form worsened in the second half of the 2009/10 season, Sedgwick found himself in and out of the side before being dropped from the matchday squad completely as Preston narrowly avoided relegation. At the end of the season Ferguson announced that he would not be extending Sedgwick's contract at the club as he was surplus to requirements.

=== Sheffield Wednesday ===
On 7 June 2010 Sedgwick was reunited with Irvine as he became Sheffield Wednesday's first signing of the 2010–11 pre-season. After playing forty-three times for the club in the league, scoring five goals, Sedgwick was amongst the six first-team players to be released after being a part of Sheffield Wednesday's promotion squad that took them up to the Football League Championship.

=== Scunthorpe United and Hyde ===
On 3 November 2012, Scunthorpe United boss Brian Laws confirmed that he had signed for the club on non-contract terms. But after three appearances he was sent out on a two-month loan to Conference National side Hyde. He made his debut for the club in a 3–1 win at Newport County. He scored his first goal in Hyde's 2–0 Boxing Day win away at Stockport County. On 22 January 2013, he signed for Hyde on a permanent basis. He made another thirteen appearances in 2012–13 without scoring, and was released at the end of the season.

=== Bury ===
On 10 July 2013, Sedgwick signed a one-year contract with League Two club Bury. In June 2015, Chris Brass was promoted to Head of Football Operations, First Team Coach Ben Futcher was promoted to Assistant Manager and Sedgwick filled the position left by Futcher as Player-Coach.

== Career statistics ==
Appearances and goals by club, season and competition
Club	Season	League^{[A]}			FA Cup		League Cup		Other^{[B]}		Total	
Club	Season	Division	Apps	Goals	Apps	Goals	Apps	Goals	Apps	Goals	Apps	Goals
Rotherham United	1997–98	Third Division	4	0	0	0	1	0	0	0	5	0
Rotherham United	1998–99	Third Division	34	3	5	0	1	0	1	0	41	3
Rotherham United	1999–2000	Third Division	38	5	2	0	1	0	2	1	43	6
Rotherham United	2000–01	Second Division	21	2	1	0	0	0	0	0	22	2
Rotherham United	2001–02	First Division	44	1	2	0	1	0	0	0	47	1
Rotherham United	2002–03	First Division	43	1	1	0	3	0	0	0	47	1
Rotherham United	2003–04	First Division	40	2	2	0	3	2	0	0	45	4
Rotherham United	2004–05	Championship	20	2	0	0	2	1	0	0	22	3
Rotherham United	Total		245	16	13	0	12	3	3	1	273	20
Preston North End	2004–05	Championship	27	3	1	0	0	0	0	0	28	3
Preston North End	2005–06	Championship	46	4	4	1	1	0	1	0	52	5
Preston North End	2006–07	Championship	43	1	3	0	1	0	0	0	47	1
Preston North End	2007–08	Championship	42	2	2	0	1	0	0	0	45	2
Preston North End	2008–09	Championship	40	1	1	0	1	0	2	0	44	1
Preston North End	2009–10	Championship	34	1	2	1	2	0	0	0	38	2
Preston North End	Total		229	12	13	2	6	0	7	0	255	14
Sheffield Wednesday	2010–11	League One	33	4	4	0	1	0	4	0	42	4
Sheffield Wednesday	2011–12	League One	10	1	4	0	1	0	1	0	16	1
Sheffield Wednesday	Total		43	5	8	0	2	0	5	0	58	5
Scunthorpe United	2012–13	League One	4	0	0	0	0	0	0	0	4	0
Hyde (loan)	2012–13	Conference National	5	1	0	0	0	0	0	0	5	1
Hyde	2012–13	Conference National	13	0	0	0	0	0	0	0	13	0
Bury	2013–14	League Two	37	2	1	0	1	0	1	1	40	3
Bury	2014–15	League Two	20	0	0	0	1	0	1	0	22	0
Bury	2015–16	League One	1	0	0	0	0	0	1	0	2	0
Bury	Total		58	2	1	0	2	0	3	0	64	3
Career total			597	36	35	2	22	3	18	1	672	43

A. The "League" column constitutes appearances and goals (including substitutes) in Championship, League One and League Two.
B. The "Other" column constitutes appearances and goals (including substitutes) in the Football League play-offs and the Football League Trophy.

== Honours ==
Sheffield Wednesday

- Football League One runners-up: 2011–12
