= Derek Shaw (businessman) =

English footballer and businessman (born 1969)

- Born: Derek Shaw
- Occupation: Businessman
- Known for: Preston North End F.C.

Derek Shaw is an English businessman, who is a former chair of English football club, Preston North End and former managing director of Blackburn Rovers. He is the owner of Ribble Valley Shelving Limited.

== Background ==
A lifelong Preston North End fan, Shaw became involved in the club through shirt sponsorship in the early 1990s. He became a board member in 1994, then Deputy chairman in 1997, before taking over as Acting chairman in 2001 after the resignation of Bryan Gray at the club's Annual general meeting. This position was made permanent in August 2002.

In August 2007, Shaw announced that he would not be standing for re-election as a director at the club's AGM later that year. However, after no "serious contenders" came forward, Shaw agreed to continue as chairman.

It was announced on 21 June 2010 that Shaw was to be replaced by Maurice Lindsay as chairman of Preston North End. but as of September 2011 he still remained on the board.

On 28 June 2012 it was announced that Shaw had been appointed as managing director of Blackburn Rovers.

On 4 April 2013, Shaw was removed from his post as managing director of Blackburn Rovers and put on "gardening leave". A statement from the official Blackburn Rovers website on 9 April 2013 stated that "the owners would like to state that there is no investigation into this matter with regard to managing director Derek Shaw who continues to have their complete backing and support."

On 2 February 2016 Shaw left Blackburn Rovers.
