= Enterprise plc =

British support services company

Enterprise
- Type: Private Company
- Industry: Support Services
- Founded: 2000 in current merged form; 1983 Lancashire Enterprises, 1964 ARM services
- Headquarters: Farington, Lancashire, England
- Key people: Alan Petersen, Chairman
- Products: Outsourced and managed services for local authorities, government departments and utility companies.
- Revenue: £1,200 million
- Number of employees: 14,000
- Website: www.enterprise.plc.uk

Enterprise plc was a support services company originally based in Farington in Lancashire, England. Its core markets were local authorities and utility sectors. It has recently been integrated into Ferrovial's UK company, Amey plc.

== History ==
The company was established in 2000 by way of a merger between Lancashire Enterprises (founded in 1983) and ARM Services (founded in 1964).

In 2007 a management buyout backed by the 3i investment group took place and the group was removed from the London Stock Exchange. On 21 September 2007 the company acquired the entire stock of Accord plc making it one of the UK's leading companies providing outsourced or partnered services to both the local authority and utilities markets.

On 21 February 2013, Ferrovial, through Ferrovial Services, reached an agreement with international investor 3i to acquire Enterprise, one of the UK's leading providers of services to utilities and the public sector, for a firm value of 385 million pounds (around 443 million euro).

== Operations ==
=== Public sector ===
A full range of direct, infrastructure and facilities management services were delivered to local authorities across the UK and Enterprise has built a strong track record in the modernisation and transformation of public services.

The public sector business was focused on the delivery of local authority services through partnership, joint venture arrangements and traditional term contracts. It has relationships with over 60 local authorities.

Enterprise was one of the first private companies to develop a full joint venture company with a local authority Liverpool City Council, 'EnterpriseLiverpool', delivering the full range of street based services throughout the city. Joint and Strategic ventures also exist with, amongst others, Manchester City Council, Liverpool City Council, Peterborough City Council, Wolverhampton City Council, Solihull MBC, City of London Corporation and the London Boroughs of Westminster, Islington, Ealing and Redbridge.

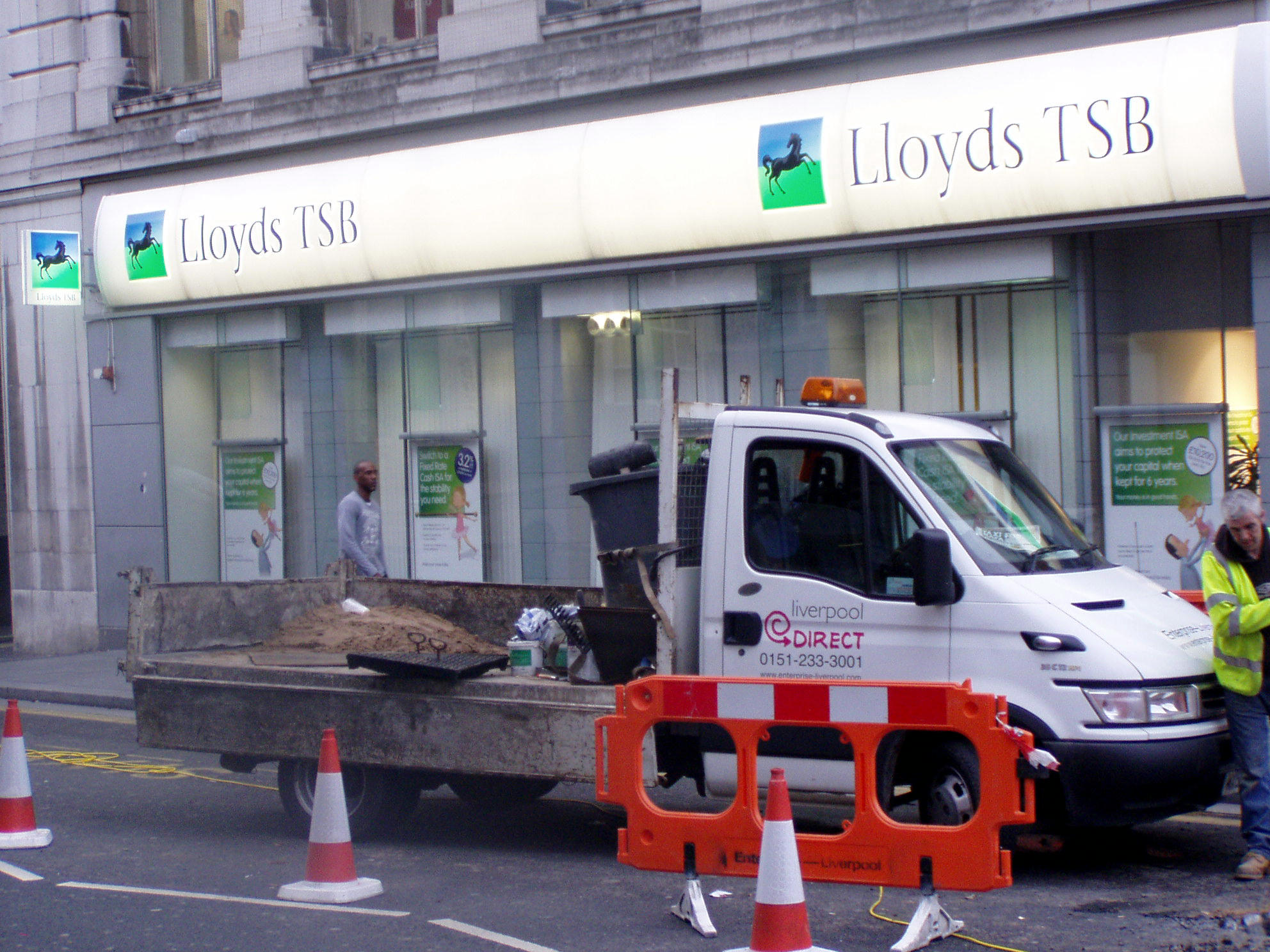
Enterprise Liverpool van on Hanover Street

The company operated throughout the UK with over 100 offices. The Head office was at Lancaster House in Farington near Leyland in Lancashire and key offices were also located in London, Manchester, West Midlands, Gloucester, Peterborough, Liverpool and the South West. The company also had operations and relations with local authorities across Wales and Northern Ireland

Enterprise had two separate joint ventures to provide services on behalf of the Ministry of Defence.

=== Utilities ===
Enterprise operated as a facilities and infrastructure service support partner to major utility companies in the water, gas and electricity sectors. Key clients included British Telecom (now known as Openreach), Severn Trent Water, United Utilities, National Grid and UK Power Networks.

In the water industry, Enterprise offered a wide range of services for the repair and maintenance of both the clean and dirty water networks and all related asset and facilities management. Enterprise works with, or has worked with, all the major water companies in the UK.

In the power and electricity sector the company provided network maintenance services throughout the electricity distribution industry across the UK and in the gas sector the company provided mains and service replacements together with asset and facilities management.
