= Adam Nowland =

English footballer (born 1981)

Personal information
- Full name: Adam Christopher Nowland
- Date of birth: 6 July 1981 (age 45)
- Place of birth: Preston, England
- Height: 5 ft 11 in (1.80 m)
- Position: Midfielder

Senior career*
Years	Team	Apps	(Gls)
1998–2001	Blackpool	69	(6)
2001–2004	Wimbledon	56	(5)
2004	West Ham United	15	(1)
2004	→ Gillingham (loan)	3	(1)
2004–2005	Nottingham Forest	5	(0)
2005–2008	Preston North End	13	(3)
2008	→ Gillingham (loan)	5	(0)
2008	→ Stockport County (loan)	4	(0)
2008	Lancaster City	1	(0)
2008–2009	Notts County	20	(0)
2009	Blackpool	0	(0)
2009–2010	AFC Fylde	0	(0)
2010	FC Tampa Bay	1	(0)
2011	North Sound SeaWolves	3	(0)
2011	Washington Crossfire	10	(2)
2011	Tacoma Stars (indoor)	5	(7)
Total		205	(18)

Managerial career
- 2011: North Sound SeaWolves (assistant)
- 2012–2013: Washington Crossfire
- * Club domestic league appearances and goals as of 25 January 2019

Adam Christopher Nowland (born 6 July 1981 in Preston) is an English retired footballer.

== Career ==
=== Early career: Blackpool and Wimbledon ===
Nowland started his career at Blackpool in 1998 where he made his professional debut at the age of 17. When he scored the first of his six League goals for the club, on 19 September, he became the youngest Blackpool player ever to score a League goal. Despite making 81 appearances (including 51 as a substitute in the League) and scoring seven goals for the Seasiders, he was released by manager Steve McMahon in May 2001.

He signed for Wimbledon on 5 June 2001 where he made 63 appearances, scoring seven goals.

=== West Ham United ===
Nowland signed for West Ham United on 23 January 2004, making eleven appearances for the club that season. After playing five games at the start of the 2004–05 season, Nowland was loaned out for one month to Gillingham on 30 September 2004, where he played three games, scoring one goal against Burnley. On his return to West Ham he played in their 1–0 League Cup defeat to Chelsea on 27 October.

=== Nottingham Forest ===
On 5 November 2004 Nottingham Forest signed Nowland for £250,000. He made his debut the following day in a 2–1 defeat to Wolverhampton Wanderers at Molineux. However, he was to make only five appearances that season.

=== Preston North End ===
Nowland joined Preston North End on a free transfer on 27 August 2005. His debut came on 16 September in 1–0 home defeat by Stoke City. He made a good start for the club, scoring three goals in nine starts, but then suffered a broken leg on 2 January 2006 in a 3–0 victory over Norwich City at Carrow Road after a bad challenge by Dickson Etuhu – a player still on loan from Preston at the time. He was out of action for the rest of the 2005–06 season and missed most of the 2006–07 season before returning to action on 17 March 2007 in a 2–0 home win over Lancashire rivals Burnley. It was to be his only appearance that season.

On 20 September 2007 he once again joined Gillingham on a month's loan, where he made six appearances, before returning to Preston on 20 October.

On 9 November he was loaned out again, this time to Stockport County until 1 January 2008., making four appearances. In January 2008 he was released by Preston.

=== Notts County ===
Nowland was without a club until he signed for Notts County on 26 June 2008. He made his debut on 22 September in a 4–0 victory over former loan club Gillingham. After making 21 appearances in the 2007–08 season, Nowland was released by Notts County on 30 April 2009.

=== Return to Blackpool ===
On 10 August 2009 Nowland signed for Championship side Blackpool on a non-contract basis. He scored his first goal in his second spell with "the Seasiders" in what was his only game, a 2–1 win over Crewe Alexandra in the first round of the 2009–10 League Cup on 11 August 2009. Two days later he was released. He then signed for Northern Premier League Division One North side AFC Fylde in September 2009.

=== North America ===
Nowland joined the new USSF Division 2 franchise FC Tampa Bay in January 2010. Nowland was released after making only one league appearance.

On 23 February 2011 North Sound SeaWolves of the USL Premier Development League announced the signing of Nowland as player-coach. Nowland will serve as assistant coach to head coach Alex Silva as well as be a field player for the squad.

After only 3 matches with North Sound, Nowland transferred to the Washington Crossfire and made his debut on 4 June 2011, in a 2–0 loss to Victoria Highlanders.

Later in 2011, he joined the Tacoma Stars of the Professional Arena Soccer League.

== Coaching ==
In 2013, Adam started Nowland Premier Soccer Academy (NPSA) to focus on coaching and developing youth soccer on the East Side of the Metro Seattle area. NPSA is affiliated with US Club Soccer and has several teams competing in the Puget Sound Premier League. He currently holds a UEFA B Coaching Licence.

== Philanthropy ==
In 2015 the NPSA Foundation was formed to provide free soccer programs for any child that wants to learn how to play the game.
