= Simon Whaley =

English footballer

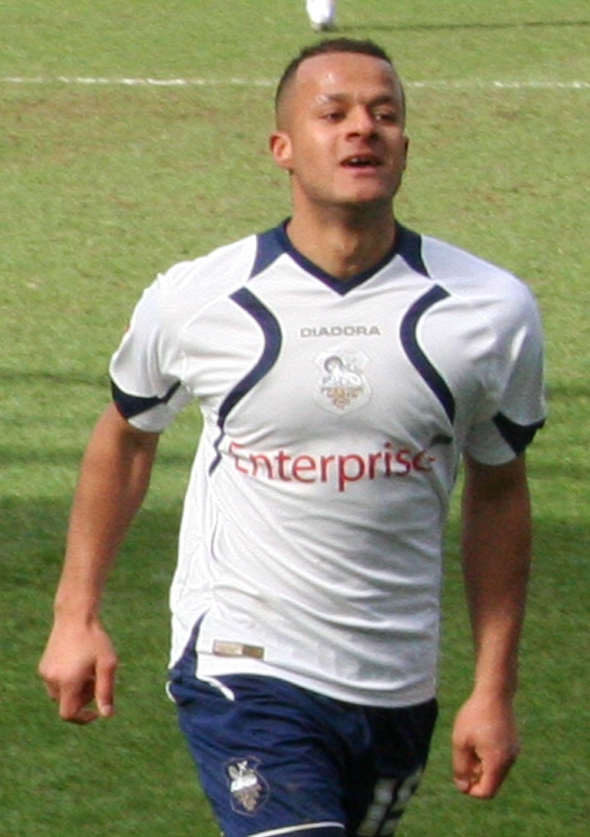
- Whaley playing for Preston North End in 2008

Personal information
- Full name: Simon Whaley
- Date of birth: 7 June 1985 (age 41)
- Place of birth: Bolton, England
- Height: 1.80 m (5 ft 11 in)
- Position: Winger

Senior career*
Years	Team	Apps	(Gls)
2002–2006	Bury	73	(11)
2006–2009	Preston North End	120	(14)
2008	→ Barnsley (loan)	4	(1)
2009–2010	Norwich City	3	(0)
2009	→ Rochdale (loan)	9	(2)
2009	→ Bradford City (loan)	6	(1)
2010	Chesterfield	6	(1)
2010–2011	Doncaster Rovers	0	(0)
2011	Burton Albion	3	(0)
2011	Chorley	19	(4)
Total		243	(34)
- * Club domestic league appearances and goals

Simon Whaley (born 7 June 1985) is an English former footballer who played as a winger. He made more than 200 appearances in the Football League playing for Bury, Preston North End, Barnsley, Norwich City, Rochdale and Bradford City.

== Career ==
Whaley was born in Bolton and began his football career as a trainee with Bury. He made his first-team debut in the Football League Trophy in October 2002 and made his first appearance in the Football League on 9 November 2002 as a second-half substitute in a 1–0 defeat at home to Torquay United, and went on to make 85 appearances for the club. After scoring seven goals in the first half of the 2005–06 season, bringing his career total to 11, Whaley stepped up two divisions to join Preston North End of the Championship in January 2006. He signed a four-and-a-half-year deal for a fee of £250,000 possibly rising to £300,000. He made his debut for Preston as a second-half substitute for Brian Stock in the League match against Millwall on 14 January, and went on to make a further 17 appearances that season, scoring three times in the last three away matches of the League season, against Leicester City, Coventry City and Hull City, as North End reached the play-offs.

He scored three goals in his first six games of the 2006–07 season, grabbing all the headlines from his former Bury teammate David Nugent, and went on to score a further three before the end of October. However, as Whaley and Preston's form faltered in the second half of the 2006/7 season it would be the final game of the season before he scored again, the only goal in the 1–0 win over Birmingham City, which was not enough to secure a play-off place as Preston finished 7th having been top of the league in December.

Whaley began the 2007/8 season in and out of the Preston squad as their poor form continued, winning only three of their first nineteen games. In November 2007 a 3–0 defeat at Hull saw the dismissal of manager Paul Simpson and, under his replacement Alan Irvine, Whaley was given a new lease of life as he switched to the left hand side to accommodate Chris Sedgwick's return on the right. This steadied Preston's defensive frailties and gave Whaley free rein as an out and out left winger leading to winning goals against Burnley and Scunthorpe in the league and in a 1–4 victory over Premiership Derby in the FA Cup.

But it was in the next round of the cup, a televised home fixture against Harry Redknapp's Portsmouth, that Whaley would seal his fate at Deepdale and possibly define the rest of his career. With the score 0–0 in the second half, Whaley ripping Portsmouth left back Glenn Johnson to shreds and Preston very much on top of their Premier League visitors, the home side were awarded a penalty. As regular and almost faultless penalty taker Callum Davidson spoke with deputy Neil Mellor, Whaley picked up the ball and placed it on the spot amidst protests from a number of his teammates. Their protests were well founded as Whaley's penalty was saved by David James and despite further chances, Preston exited the competition to a last minute own goal.

Following the game Whaley is rumoured to have been outcast by his teammates and subsequently his form dropped during the remainder of the season whilst a widely touted £1.5m transfer to Middlesbrough failed to materialise.

Despite Whaley starting the 2008/09 season as first choice and scoring the winning in Preston's opening day win at Ipswich he soon found himself as second choice behind newly arrived Ross Wallace. Out of favour and still rumoured to be unpopular in the dressing room, Whaley joined Barnsley on loan for a month in November 2008. Whaley returned determined to fight for his place but found himself reduced to substitute appearances with his next start only coming in March 2009 before Whaley was dropped completely following a 0–1 defeat to rivals Blackpool. Whaley did not return that season as Preston won their remaining games to reach the playoff semi finals.

In July 2009 Whaley signed a two-year contract with Norwich City for an undisclosed fee, later reported as £250,000.

Whaley started Norwich's first four games, but then lost his place under new manager Paul Lambert, and in mid-September he joined Rochdale on a month's loan. He made his debut against Northampton Town as a 62nd-minute substitute, and on his first start for the club, scored their second goal in a 4–1 victory over Hereford United. After a second month with Rochdale, Whaley moved on to Bradford City, on loan until 2 January 2010, making his debut on 21 November as a second-half substitute, replacing Scott Neilson in a 1–1 draw with AFC Bournemouth. Bradford City chose not to extend Whaley's loan, and on 1 February his Norwich contract was cancelled by mutual consent, leaving him a free agent.

After a trial with Oldham Athletic, Whaley signed for League Two club Chesterfield until the end of the season.

In November 2010, he started training with Doncaster Rovers to regain his fitness, and due to an injury crisis, he was signed by the Championship club on non-contract terms so that he could take his place on the bench for an away game at Portsmouth, which Doncaster won 3–2. He was an unused substitute in this game having played no competitive football since March, and subsequently left the club on 12 January 2011.

From 9 February 2011, Whaley went on a second trial at promotion chasing Oldham Athletic but was not successful during the trial.

On 4 March Whaley signed for Burton Albion on a short-term contract, and made his debut the following day in the 4–1 defeat at Crewe Alexandra. He left the club in late March after 3 appearances for the Brewers. Whaley joined Northern Premier League side Chorley in August 2011, later opting to retire from playing in December 2011, due to a recurring knee injury and now intends to move into coaching.
