= Callum Davidson =

Scottish footballer & manager (born 1976)

Personal information
- Full name: Callum Iain Davidson
- Date of birth: 25 June 1976 (age 50)
- Place of birth: Stirling, Stirlingshire, Scotland
- Height: 1.77 m (5 ft 10 in)
- Position: Left-back

Senior career*
Years	Team	Apps	(Gls)
1994–1998	St Johnstone	43	(4)
1998–2000	Blackburn Rovers	66	(1)
2000–2004	Leicester City	101	(2)
2004–2011	Preston North End	166	(21)
2011–2014	St Johnstone	47	(1)
Total		423	(29)

International career
1998–2009	Scotland	19	(0)

Managerial career
- 2014: St Johnstone (caretaker)
- 2020–2023: St Johnstone
- 2024–2025: Queen's Park
- * Club domestic league appearances and goals

Callum Iain Davidson (born 25 June 1976) is a Scottish professional football coach and former player.

Davidson played as a left-back for St Johnstone, Blackburn Rovers, Leicester City and Preston North End between 1994 and 2014. At international level, Davidson represented Scotland on 19 occasions between 1998 and 2009. Since retiring as a player, Davidson has become a football coach, and was given his first full-time role in management with St Johnstone in June 2020. He won both domestic cup competitions in his first season as St Johnstone manager, a position he left in April 2023.

== Early life ==
Davidson grew up in Dunblane and attended Dunblane High School from 1988 to 1994, for which he captained the football team. His performances for the team led to his being scouted. He also played tennis at the school, and was part of the team that won the Scottish Schools Championship, where he was coached under Judy Murray. He also represented Scotland in golf.

== Club career ==
Davidson was scouted and subsequently signed by St Johnstone. His performances for the Perth club attracted interest from Premiership clubs, resulting in a move to Blackburn Rovers in February 1998 for £1.75m, a St Johnstone club record. He spent two years at Ewood Park, making 66 league appearances and scoring once, against West Ham United.

Davidson joined Leicester City in July 2000, for a fee of £2.75m, and he remained with the Foxes for four years, making over 100 appearances. He was signed by Preston North End in 2004 on a free transfer and was later appointed club captain. His time at Deepdale was dominated by recurring injury problems, but he still managed to make over 160 appearances for Preston.

On 26 May 2011, Davidson rejoined his first professional club St Johnstone on a one-year deal on a free transfer after being released from Preston North End earlier in the year. He made his debut on 23 July against Aberdeen. He scored his first goal for St Johnstone in a 3–1 win over Dunfermline on 25 February 2012. St Johnstone chairman Steve Brown had initially indicated the club would not be offering Davidson a new contract due to his age, with Davidson's form forcing him into a rethink. Davidson extended his contract with St Johnstone for another season in March 2012.

== International career ==
Davidson made his first full international appearance for Scotland in September 1998, in a goalless draw with Lithuania. He played regularly during the UEFA Euro 2000 qualifying campaign, including the second leg of the play-off tie with England. After six years out of the national team, he was included in George Burley's squad to face Northern Ireland in August 2008, but did not play. He then started in a 4–0 defeat against Norway in August 2009. Davidson ended up winning 19 caps in total, with his final appearance being in a 2–0 win against Macedonia in September 2009.

== Coaching career ==
Davidson was appointed assistant manager of St Johnstone in June 2013, while retaining his registration as a player. He did not make any playing appearances in the 2013–14 season, during which St Johnstone won the 2013–14 Scottish Cup. Davidson temporarily took charge of the team in March 2014, while manager Tommy Wright was in hospital having a gall bladder operation. He was added to the coaching staff of the Scotland national football team during 2017.

Davidson left St Johnstone in June 2018, when he became a first-team coach at Stoke City. Davidson linked up with Gary Rowett, who had been his teammate at Leicester. Rowett and Davidson both left Stoke on 8 January 2019.

In February 2019, Davidson became first-team coach at Dunfermline Athletic. He left this position in the summer of 2019, and was then appointed assistant manager of Millwall in October 2019 (again working with Gary Rowett).

=== St. Johnstone ===
He was appointed manager of St Johnstone in June 2020, succeeding Tommy Wright. He won the Scottish League Cup and Scottish Cup double in his first season in charge, beating Livingston and Hibernian in the finals 1–0 respectively. The team struggled in 2021–22 and only avoided relegation by winning a play-off against Championship club Inverness. They again struggled during the 2022–23 season, and Davidson was sacked in April 2023.

=== Queen's Park ===
Davidson was appointed head coach of Scottish Championship club Queen's Park on 9 January 2024. He was sacked on 15 March 2025 following a 4–0 defeat to Falkirk.

On 10 September 2025, Davidson was appointed assistant manager of Ross County. He then took a similar position at Leicester City in February 2026.

== Career statistics ==
=== International ===
Scotland
Year	Apps	Goals
1998	3	0
1999	8	0
2000	2	0
2001	2	0
2002	2	0
2009	2	0
Total	19	0

=== Managerial record ===
As of match played 15 March 2025

Managerial record by team and tenure
Team	From	To	Record					
Team	From	To	G	W	D	L	Win %	Ref.
St Johnstone	1 June 2020	16 April 2023	136	42	37	57	30.88	
Queen's Park	9 January 2024	15 March 2025	60	25	13	22	41.67	
Total			196	67	50	79	34.18	—

== Honours ==
=== Manager ===
St Johnstone

- Scottish Cup: 2020–21
- Scottish League Cup: 2020–21

=== Individual ===
St Johnstone

- Scottish Premiership Manager of the Month: March 2021
