= 2006–07 West Bromwich Albion F.C. season =

West Bromwich Albion
2006–07 season
- Chairman: Jeremy Peace
- Manager: Bryan Robson (until 18 September); Nigel Pearson (caretaker); Craig Shakespeare (caretaker); Tony Mowbray (from 13 October)
- Stadium: The Hawthorns
- Championship: 4th (qualified for play-offs)
- Play-offs: Runners-up
- FA Cup: Fifth round
- League Cup: Third round
- Top goalscorer: League: Diomansy Kamara (20); All: Diomansy Kamara (22)
- Highest home attendance: 26,606 (vs. Wolverhampton Wanderers, 22 October 2006)
- Lowest home attendance: 17,417 (vs. Queen's Park Rangers, 31 October 2006)
- Average home league attendance: 20,471
| Home colours | Away colours | Third colours |

During the 2006–07 season, West Bromwich Albion competed in the Football League Championship, having been relegated from the FA Premier League the previous season.

== Season summary ==
West Brom began the season slowly and manager Bryan Robson departed as manager in October by mutual consent. Under his successor, Tony Mowbray, West Brom were a permanent fixture in the top six from late December onwards and led the division briefly in February, but a run of four defeats in five games at home saw them fall out of contention for automatic promotion. They secured their play-off place with a 7–0 home win against Barnsley on the final day of the league season, finishing fourth in the process. This was one place above Wolverhampton Wanderers, by virtue of a superior goal difference, but eight points behind Derby County. West Brom scored 81 league goals during the campaign, the highest tally of any team in the Football League in 2006–07.

In the play-off semi-finals, Albion faced local rivals and fifth-placed team Wolverhampton Wanderers, winning the first leg 3–2 and the second 1–0 to progress 4–2 on aggregate. The second leg was the fifth meeting between the two sides during 2006–07, setting a new record for the most times that the Black Country derby has been contested in a single campaign, while West Brom's four wins against their rivals was also a season record for matches between the two.

In the play-off final game, West Brom were defeated by Derby, with Stephen Pearson scoring the only goal of the game.

== Kit ==
English company Umbro became West Brom's kit manufacturers for the season. T-Mobile remained the kit sponsors.

== Final league table ==
| Pos | Team | Pld | W | D | L | GF | GA | GD | Pts | Promotion, qualification or relegation |
|---|---|---|---|---|---|---|---|---|---|---|
| 2 | Birmingham City (P) | 46 | 26 | 8 | 12 | 67 | 42 | +25 | 86 | Promotion to the Premier League |
| 3 | Derby County (O, P) | 46 | 25 | 9 | 12 | 62 | 46 | +16 | 84 | Qualification for Championship play-offs |
| 4 | West Bromwich Albion | 46 | 22 | 10 | 14 | 81 | 55 | +26 | 76 | Qualification for Championship play-offs |
| 5 | Wolverhampton Wanderers | 46 | 22 | 10 | 14 | 59 | 56 | +3 | 76 | Qualification for Championship play-offs |
| 6 | Southampton | 46 | 21 | 12 | 13 | 77 | 53 | +24 | 75 | Qualification for Championship play-offs |

Source: RSSSF
Rules for classification: In the Football League goals scored (F) takes precedence over goal difference (GD).
(O) Play-off winners; (P) Promoted

== Results ==
West Bromwich Albion's score comes first

=== Legend ===
| Win | Draw | Loss |

=== Football League Championship ===
| Date | Opponent | Venue | Result | Attendance | Scorers |
|---|---|---|---|---|---|
| 5 August 2006 | Hull City | H | 2–0 | 20,682 (2,477) | Hartson (2) |
| 8 August 2006 | Cardiff City | A | 1–1 | 18,506 | Gera |
| 12 August 2006 | Southampton | A | 0–0 | 24,233 | |
| 19 August 2006 | Colchester United | H | 2–1 | 17,509 (668) | Ellington (pen.), Wallwork |
| 28 August 2006 | Sunderland | A | 0–2 | 24,242 (923) | |
| 9 September 2006 | Leicester City | H | 2–0 | 19,322 (2,183) | Kenton (own goal), Phillips (pen) |
| 12 September 2006 | Preston North End | A | 0–1 | 12,119 | |
| 16 September 2006 | Southend United | H | 1–1 | 19,576 | Ellington |
| 23 September 2006 | Luton Town | A | 2–2 | 9,332 (1,785) | Carter, Gera |
| 30 September 2006 | Leeds United | H | 4–2 | 21,435 (2,600) | Albrechtsen, Kamara (2), Phillips |
| 14 October 2006 | Ipswich Town | A | 5–1 | 22,581 (1,422) | Kamara (2), Phillips (3) |
| 17 October 2006 | Crystal Palace | A | 2–0 | 16,105 (1,123) | Gera, Kamara |
| 22 October 2006 | Wolverhampton Wanderers | H | 3–0 | 26,606 (2,600) | Greening, Kamara, Hartson (pen) |
| 28 October 2006 | Birmingham City | A | 0–2 | 21,009 (2,987) | |
| 31 October 2006 | Queens Park Rangers | H | 3–3 | 17,417 (484) | Ellington, Kamara (2) |
| 4 November 2006 | Derby County | A | 1–2 | 25,342 (2,609) | Chaplow |
| 11 November 2006 | Norwich City | H | 0–1 | 18,718 (904) | |
| 18 November 2006 | Burnley | H | 3–0 | 18,707 (1,744) | Koumas, Ellington, Carter |
| 25 November 2006 | Stoke City | A | 0–1 | 18,282 | |
| 28 November 2006 | Sheffield Wednesday | A | 1–3 | 21,695 (946) | Koumas |
| 2 December 2006 | Derby County | H | 1–0 | 20,494 (2,600) | Hartson |
| 10 December 2006 | Barnsley | A | 1–1 | 9,512 (347) | Koumas |
| 16 December 2006 | Coventry City | H | 5–0 | 20,370 | Kamara (2, 1 pen), Koumas, Phillips, Robinson |
| 23 December 2006 | Plymouth Argyle | A | 2–2 | 15,172 | Phillips (2) |
| 26 December 2006 | Preston North End | H | 4–2 | 22,905 (1,988) | Koumas, Kamara, Ellington (2) |
| 30 December 2006 | Ipswich Town | H | 2–0 | 20,328 | Kamara, Koumas |
| 1 January 2007 | Southend United | A | 1–3 | 9,907 | Hartson |
| 12 January 2007 | Luton Town | H | 3–2 | 19,927 (499) | Koumas, Phillips (2) |
| 20 January 2007 | Leeds United | A | 3–2 | 20,019 | Greening, Kamara (2) |
| 31 January 2007 | Plymouth Argyle | H | 2–1 | 19,894 (961) | Kamara (2, 1 pen) |
| 3 February 2007 | Hull City | A | 1–0 | 18,005 (1,364) | Kamara |
| 10 February 2007 | Southampton | H | 1–1 | 21,138 | Phillips |
| 13 February 2007 | Colchester United | A | 2–1 | 5,611 (1,000) | McShane, Kamara |
| 20 February 2007 | Cardiff City | H | 1–0 | 18,802 (1,462) | Ellington |
| 24 February 2007 | Leicester City | A | 1–1 | 25,581 (3,300) | Kamara (pen) |
| 3 March 2007 | Sunderland | H | 1–2 | 23,252 (2,598) | Carter |
| 11 March 2007 | Wolverhampton Wanderers | A | 0–1 | 28,016 (2,600) | |
| 14 March 2007 | Crystal Palace | H | 2–3 | 17,960 | Clement, Phillips |
| 18 March 2007 | Birmingham City | H | 1–1 | 21,434 (2,590) | McShane |
| 31 March 2007 | Queens Park Rangers | A | 2–1 | 14,784 (2,600) | Phillips, Gera |
| 7 April 2007 | Stoke City | H | 1–3 | 20,386 | Koumas |
| 9 April 2007 | Norwich City | A | 2–1 | 25,422 (2,500) | Sodje, Kamara |
| 13 April 2007 | Sheffield Wednesday | H | 0–1 | 20,415 | |
| 23 April 2007 | Burnley | A | 2–3 | 12,500 | Koumas, Ellington |
| 28 April 2007 | Coventry City | A | 1–0 | 26,343 | Robinson |
| 6 May 2007 | Barnsley | H | 7–0 | 23,568 (1,936) | Phillips (3), Ellington (2, 1 pen), Koren, Gera |

=== Championship play-offs ===
| Round | Date | Opponent | Venue | Result | Attendance | Goalscorers |
|---|---|---|---|---|---|---|
| SF 1st Leg | 13 May 2007 | Wolverhampton Wanderers | A | 3–2 | 27,750 (2,600) | Phillips (2), Kamara |
| SF 2nd Leg | 16 May 2007 | Wolverhampton Wanderers | H | 1–0 (won 4–2 on agg) | 27,415 (2,600) | Phillips |
| F | 28 May 2007 | Derby County | N | 0–1 | 74,993 | |

=== FA Cup ===
| Round | Date | Opponent | Venue | Result | Attendance | Goalscorers |
|---|---|---|---|---|---|---|
| R3 | 6 January 2007 | Leeds United | H | 3–1 | 16,957 (2,327) | McShane, Hartson, Phillips |
| R4 | 28 January 2007 | Wolverhampton Wanderers | A | 3–0 | 28,107 (5,500) | Kamara, Phillips, Gera |
| R5 | 17 February 2007 | Middlesbrough | A | 2–2 | 31,491 (2,395) | Kamara, Phillips |
| R5R | 27 February 2007 | Middlesbrough | H | 1–1 (lost 4–5 on pens) | 24,925 | Carter |

=== League Cup ===
| Round | Date | Opponent | Venue | Result | Attendance | Goalscorers |
|---|---|---|---|---|---|---|
| R1 | 24 August 2006 | Leyton Orient | A | 3–0 | 3,058 (1,126) | Nicholson, Carter, Greening |
| R2 | 19 September 2006 | Cheltenham Town | H | 3–1 | 10,974 (1,885) | Wallwork, Ellington (pen), Nicholson (pen) |
| R3 | 24 October 2006 | Arsenal | H | 0–2 | 21,566 | |

== Players ==
=== First-team squad ===
Squad at end of season

Note: Flags indicate national team as defined under FIFA eligibility rules; some limited exceptions apply. Players may hold more than one non-FIFA nationality.

| No. | Pos. | Nation | Player |
|---|---|---|---|
| 2 | DF | ENG | Steve Watson |
| 3 | DF | ENG | Paul Robinson |
| 4 | DF | ENG | Chris Perry |
| 5 | DF | ENG | Neil Clement |
| 6 | DF | ENG | Curtis Davies |
| 8 | MF | ENG | Jonathan Greening |
| 9 | FW | ENG | Nathan Ellington |
| 10 | FW | WAL | John Hartson |
| 11 | MF | HUN | Zoltán Gera |
| 12 | MF | ENG | Richard Chaplow |
| 13 | GK | ENG | Luke Steele |
| 14 | DF | DEN | Martin Albrechtsen |
| 15 | FW | SEN | Diomansy Kamara (Note: Kamara was born in Paris, France, but also qualified to represent Senegal internationally and made his international debut for Senegal in 2003.) |
| 16 | MF | SVN | Robert Koren |
| 17 | MF | ENG | Darren Carter |

| No. | Pos. | Nation | Player |
|---|---|---|---|
| 19 | MF | WAL | Jason Koumas |
| 20 | DF | IRL | Paul McShane |
| 21 | FW | ENG | Kevin Phillips |
| 22 | FW | ENG | Stuart Nicholson |
| 23 | DF | ENG | Jeff Forsyth |
| 24 | DF | ENG | Ronnie Wallwork |
| 26 | MF | WAL | Rob Davies |
| 27 | FW | ENG | Rob Elvins |
| 28 | DF | ENG | Jared Hodgkiss |
| 30 | GK | ENG | Luke Daniels |
| 31 | GK | IRL | Dean Kiely (Note: Kiely was born in Salford, England, and represented them at U-15, U-16, and U-18 level, but also qualified to represent the Republic of Ireland internationally and made his international debut for the Republic of Ireland in November 1999.) |
| 32 | FW | NED | Sherjill MacDonald |
| 33 | FW | ENG | Michael Nardiello |
| 34 | DF | NGA | Sam Sodje (Note: Sodje was born in Greenwich, England, but also qualified to represent Nigeria internationally through his parents and made his international debut for Nigeria in November 2005.) (on loan from Reading) |

=== Left club during season ===
Note: Flags indicate national team as defined under FIFA eligibility rules; some limited exceptions apply. Players may hold more than one non-FIFA nationality.

| No. | Pos. | Nation | Player |
|---|---|---|---|
| 1 | GK | SUI | Pascal Zuberbühler (to Neuchâtel Xamax) |
| 7 | MF | SCO | Nigel Quashie (Note: Quashie was born in Southwark, England, and represented them at U-21 and B-level, but also qualified to represent Scotland internationally through his grandfather and made his international debut for Scotland in May 2004.) (to West Ham United) |
| 16 | MF | JPN | Junichi Inamoto (to Galatasaray) |

| No. | Pos. | Nation | Player |
|---|---|---|---|
| 18 | DF | DEN | Thomas Gaardsøe (retired) |
| 25 | GK | ENG | Russell Hoult (to Stoke City) |
| 29 | GK | POL | Tomasz Kuszczak (on loan to Manchester United) |

=== Transfers ===
==== In ====
| Date | Nation | Position | Name | From | Fee | Reference |
|---|---|---|---|---|---|---|
| 26 June 2006 | WAL | FW | John Hartson | Celtic | £500,000 | |
| 4 July 2006 | ENG | DF | Chris Perry | Charlton Athletic | Free | |
| 14 July 2006 | SUI | GK | Pascal Zuberbühler | Basel | Free | |
| 10 August 2006 | IRL | DF | Paul McShane | Manchester United | Undisclosed | |
| 10 August 2006 | ENG | GK | Luke Steele | Manchester United | Undisclosed | |
| 22 August 2006 | ENG | FW | Kevin Phillips | Aston Villa | £700,000 | |
| 4 January 2007 | SVN | MF | Robert Koren | Lillestrom | Free | |
| 30 January 2007 | IRL | GK | Dean Kiely | Portsmouth | Free | |

==== Out ====
| Date | Nation | Position | Name | To | Fee | Reference |
|---|---|---|---|---|---|---|
| 24 May 2006 | ENG | FW | Geoff Horsfield | Sheffield United | £1,200,000 | |
| 23 June 2006 | WAL | MF | Andy Johnson | Leicester City | Free | |
| 2 August 2006 | ENG | FW | Kevin Campbell | Cardiff City | Free | |
| 17 August 2006 | NGA | FW | Nwankwo Kanu | Portsmouth | Free | |
| 31 August 2006 | JAP | MF | Junichi Inamoto | Galatasaray | Undisclosed | |
| 8 January 2007 | SCO | MF | Nigel Quashie | West Ham United | £1,500,000 | |
| 31 January 2007 | ENG | GK | Russell Hoult | Stoke City | Free | |
| 14 February 2007 | SUI | GK | Pascal Zuberbühler | Neuchâtel Xamax | Free | |

==== Loans In ====
| Date | Nation | Position | Name | From | Length | Reference |
|---|---|---|---|---|---|---|
| 26 January 2007 | SUR | FW | Sherjill Mac-Donald | AGOVV | Until end of season | |
| 17 March 2007 | NGA | DF | Sam Sodje | Reading | One Month (extended 17 April) | |

==== Loans Out ====
| Date | Nation | Position | Name | To | Length | Reference |
|---|---|---|---|---|---|---|
| 10 August 2006 | POL | GK | Tomasz Kuszczak | Manchester United | Full Season | |
| 16 November 2006 | ENG | FW | Stuart Nicholson | Bristol Rovers | Until 19 January 2007 | |
| 17 November 2006 | WAL | MF | Rob Davies | Kidderminster Harriers | One month | |
| 23 November 2006 | ENG | MF | Ronnie Wallwork | Barnsley | Until 1 January 2007 | |
| 23 December 2006 | ENG | GK | Luke Steele | Coventry City | Until end of season | |
| 31 January 2007 | ENG | FW | Stuart Nicholson | Bristol Rovers | Until end of season | |
| 9 February 2007 | ENG | DF | Steve Watson | Sheffield Wednesday | Until end of season | |
