= 2005–06 West Bromwich Albion F.C. season =

West Bromwich Albion
2005–06 season
- Chairman: Jeremy Peace
- Manager: Bryan Robson
- Stadium: The Hawthorns
- FA Premier League: 19th (relegated)
- FA Cup: Third round
- League Cup: Fourth round
- Top goalscorer: League: Kanu/Ellington (5); All: Ellington (8)
- Highest home attendance: 27,623 (vs. Manchester United, 18 March 2006)
- Lowest home attendance: 23,144 (vs. Fulham, 3 December 2005)
- Average home league attendance: 25,403
Home colours	Away colours	Third colours

During the 2005–06 season, West Bromwich Albion competed in the FA Premier League.

== Season summary ==
Despite attaining FA Premier League survival on the final day of the previous season, this time West Brom were unable to repeat their "great escape" and were relegated to the Championship. West Brom had spent much of the season just ahead of the relegation zone, but Portsmouth's late run of good form – in addition to West Brom failing to win any of their final 13 fixtures – dragged the Midlanders into the relegation places.

== Kit ==
West Brom retained their kit manufacturing agreement with Diadora, who introduced a new kit for the season. T-Mobile remained the kit sponsors.

== Final league table ==
Pos	Team	Pld	W	D	L	GF	GA	GD	Pts	Qualification or relegation
16	Aston Villa	38	10	12	16	42	55	−13	42	
17	Portsmouth	38	10	8	20	37	62	−25	38	
18	Birmingham City (R)	38	8	10	20	28	50	−22	34	Relegation to the Football League Championship
19	West Bromwich Albion (R)	38	7	9	22	31	58	−27	30	Relegation to the Football League Championship
20	Sunderland (R)	38	3	6	29	26	69	−43	15	Relegation to the Football League Championship

Source: Barclays Premier League
Rules for classification: 1) points; 2) goal difference; 3) number of goals scored.
(R) Relegated

== Results ==
West Bromwich Albion's score comes first

=== Legend ===
Win	Draw	Loss

=== FA Premier League ===
Date	Opponent	Venue	Result	Attendance	Scorers
13 August 2005	Manchester City	A	0–0	42,983	
20 August 2005	Portsmouth	H	2–1	24,404	Horsfield (2)
24 August 2005	Chelsea	A	0–4	41,201	
27 August 2005	Birmingham City	H	2–3	23,993 (2,353)	Horsfield (2)
10 September 2005	Wigan Athletic	H	1–2	25,617	Greening
17 September 2005	Sunderland	A	1–1	31,657 (1,809)	Gera
24 September 2005	Charlton Athletic	H	1–2	23,909	Davies
1 October 2005	Blackburn Rovers	A	0–2	20,721	
15 October 2005	Arsenal	H	2–1	26,604 (2,600)	Kanu, Carter
23 October 2005	Bolton Wanderers	A	0–2	24,151	
30 October 2005	Newcastle United	H	0–3	26,216	
5 November 2005	West Ham United	A	0–1	34,325 (2,621)	
19 November 2005	Everton	H	4–0	24,784 (2,595)	Ellington (2, 1 pen), Clement, Earnshaw
27 November 2005	Middlesbrough	A	2–2	27,041 (1,020)	Ellington, Kanu
3 December 2005	Fulham	H	0–0	23,144	
10 December 2005	Manchester City	H	2–0	25,472 (2,599)	Kamara, Campbell
17 December 2005	Portsmouth	A	0–1	20,052	
26 December 2005	Manchester United	A	0–3	67,972	
28 December 2005	Tottenham Hotspur	H	2–0	27,510 (2,600)	Kanu (2)
31 December 2005	Liverpool	A	0–1	44,192 (1,736)	
2 January 2006	Aston Villa	H	1–2	27,073 (2,600)	Watson
15 January 2006	Wigan Athletic	A	1–0	17,421 (3,316)	Albrechtsen
21 January 2006	Sunderland	H	0–1	26,464 (1,585)	
31 January 2006	Charlton Athletic	A	0–0	25,921	
4 February 2006	Blackburn Rovers	H	2–0	23,993 (838)	Campbell, Greening
11 February 2006	Fulham	A	1–6	21,508 (3,300)	Campbell
26 February 2006	Middlesbrough	H	0–2	24,061	
4 March 2006	Chelsea	H	1–2	26,581 (2,600)	Kanu
11 March 2006	Birmingham City	A	1–1	28,041 (2,694)	Ellington
18 March 2006	Manchester United	H	1–2	27,623 (2,599)	Ellington
27 March 2006	Tottenham Hotspur	A	1–2	36,152	Davies
1 April 2006	Liverpool	H	0–2	27,576 (2,598)	
9 April 2006	Aston Villa	A	0–0	33,303	
15 April 2006	Arsenal	A	1–3	38,167 (2,900)	Quashie
17 April 2006	Bolton Wanderers	H	0–0	23,181	
22 April 2006	Newcastle United	A	0–3	52,272	
1 May 2006	West Ham United	H	0–1	24,462 (2,308)	
7 May 2006	Everton	A	2–2	39,671	Gera, Martínez

=== FA Cup ===
Round	Date	Opponent	Venue	Result	Attendance	Goalscorers
R3	7 January 2006	Reading	H	1–1	19,197	Gera (pen.)
R3R	17 January 2006	Reading	A	2–3 (a.e.t.)	16,737 (1,487)	Chaplow (2)

=== League Cup ===
Round	Date	Opponent	Venue	Result	Attendance	Goalscorers
R2	20 September 2005	Bradford City	H	4–1	10,792	Ellington (2), Kamara, Earnshaw
R3	25 October 2005	Fulham	A	3–2 (a.e.t.)	7,373 (688)	Earnshaw, Kanu, Inamoto
R4	30 November 2005	Manchester United	A	1–3	48,924	Ellington

== Players ==
=== First-team squad ===
Squad at end of season

Note: Flags indicate national team as defined under FIFA eligibility rules; some limited exceptions apply. Players may hold more than one non-FIFA nationality.

No.	Pos.	Nation	Player
1	GK	ENG	Russell Hoult
3	DF	ENG	Paul Robinson
4	DF	DEN	Thomas Gaardsøe
5	DF	URU	Williams Martínez (on loan from Defensor Sporting)
6	DF	ENG	Neil Clement
7	MF	SCO	Nigel Quashie (Note: Quashie was born in Southwark, England, and represented them at U-21 and B-level, but also qualified to represent Scotland internationally through his grandfather and made his international debut for Scotland in May 2004.)
8	MF	ENG	Jonathan Greening
9	FW	ENG	Geoff Horsfield
10	MF	WAL	Andy Johnson (Note: Johnson was born in Bristol, England, but also qualified to represent Wales internationally and made his international debut for Wales in 1998.)
11	MF	HUN	Zoltán Gera
12	MF	ENG	Richard Chaplow
13	MF	SVK	Jan Kozak (on loan from Artmedia Bratislava)
14	DF	DEN	Martin Albrechtsen
15	FW	SEN	Diomansy Kamara (Note: Kamara was born in Paris, France, but also qualified to represent Senegal internationally and made his international debut for Senegal in 2003.)
16	DF	ENG	Steve Watson

No.	Pos.	Nation	Player
17	MF	ENG	Darren Carter
19	DF	ENG	Curtis Davies
20	GK	ENG	Chris Kirkland (on loan from Liverpool)
21	FW	ENG	Kevin Campbell (captain)
22	FW	ENG	Nathan Ellington
24	DF	ENG	Ronnie Wallwork
25	FW	NGR	Nwankwo Kanu
26	MF	WAL	Rob Davies
27	FW	ENG	Rob Elvins
28	DF	ENG	Jared Hodgkiss
29	GK	POL	Tomasz Kuszczak
30	MF	ENG	Brian Smikle
31	FW	ENG	Stuart Nicholson
32	DF	ENG	Jeff Forsyth
33	MF	JPN	Junichi Inamoto

=== Left club during season ===
Note: Flags indicate national team as defined under FIFA eligibility rules; some limited exceptions apply. Players may hold more than one non-FIFA nationality.

No.	Pos.	Nation	Player
2	DF	ENG	Riccardo Scimeca (to Cardiff City)
5	DF	JAM	Darren Moore (Note: Moore was born in Birmingham, England, but also qualified to represent Jamaica internationally and made his international debut for Jamaica in 1999.) (to Derby County)
18	MF	ENG	Lloyd Dyer (to Millwall)

No.	Pos.	Nation	Player
23	FW	WAL	Robert Earnshaw (Note: Earnshaw was born in Mufulira, Zambia, but was raised in Wales and made his international debut for Wales in May 2002.) (to Norwich City)
—	MF	WAL	Jason Koumas (on loan to Cardiff City)
—	GK	IRL	Joe Murphy (to Sunderland)

== Transfers ==
=== In ===
Date	Nation	Position	Name	From	Fee	Reference
4 July 2005	(England)	MF	Darren Carter	Birmingham City	£1,500,000	
5 July 2005	(England)	DF	Steve Watson	Everton	Free	
16 July 2005	(England)	GK	Chris Kirkland	Liverpool	Loan	
28 July 2005	(Senegal)	FW	Diomansy Kamara	Modena	£1,500,000	
13 August 2005	(England)	FW	Nathan Ellington	Wigan Athletic	£3,000,000	
31 August 2005	(England)	DF	Curtis Davies	Luton Town	£3,000,000	
20 January 2006	(Slovakia)	MF	Jan Kozak	Artmedia Bratislava	Loan	
31 January 2006	(England)	MF	Nigel Quashie	Southampton	£1,400.000	

=== Out ===
Date	Nation	Position	Name	To	Fee	Reference
9 May 2005	(England)	FW	Rob Hulse	Leeds United	£1,100,000	
27 July 2005	(Wales)	MF	Jason Koumas	Cardiff City	Loan	
28 July 2005	(England)	DF	Darren Purse	Cardiff City	£1,000,000	
26 September 2005	(England)	MF	Lloyd Dyer	Queens Park Rangers	Loan	
13 January 2006	(England)	DF	Riccardo Scimeca	Cardiff City	Free	
26 January 2006	(Jamaica)	DF	Darren Moore	Derby County	£500,000	
27 January 2006	(England)	MF	Lloyd Dyer	Millwall	Free	

== Statistics ==
=== Starting 11 ===
Considering starts in all competitions

No.	Pos.	Nat.	Name	MS	Notes
29	GK	(Poland)	Tomasz Kuszczak	30	
14	RB	(Denmark)	Martin Albrechtsen	30	
19	CB	(England)	Curtis Davies	35	
6	CB	(England)	Neil Clement	32	
3	LB	(England)	Paul Robinson	36	
8	RM	(England)	Jonathan Greening	40	
16	CM	(England)	Steve Watson	29	
24	CM	(England)	Ronnie Wallwork	35	
33	LM	(Japan)	Junichi Inamoto	20	
15	CF	(Senegal)	Diomansy Kamara	24	Kevin Campbell has 19 starts
22	CF	(England)	Nathan Ellington	19	Nwankwo Kanu has 19 starts
