= Richard Chaplow =

English footballer (born 1985)

Personal information
- Full name: Richard David Chaplow
- Date of birth: 2 February 1985 (age 41)
- Place of birth: Accrington, England
- Height: 5 ft 9 in (1.75 m)
- Position: Midfielder

Youth career
- 1993–2003: Burnley

Senior career*
Years	Team	Apps	(Gls)
2003–2005	Burnley	65	(7)
2005–2008	West Bromwich Albion	44	(1)
2006	→ Southampton (loan)	11	(1)
2008–2011	Preston North End	68	(8)
2010	→ Southampton (loan)	9	(2)
2011–2013	Southampton	52	(5)
2013	→ Millwall (loan)	4	(0)
2013–2015	Millwall	26	(1)
2015	→ Ipswich Town (loan)	6	(1)
2015–2016	Doncaster Rovers	27	(2)
2016–2018	Orange County SC	49	(4)
Total		361	(32)

International career
2004	England U19	1	(0)
2005	England U20	2	(0)
2005	England U21	1	(0)

Managerial career
- 2019–2021: Orange County SC (assistant)
- 2021: Orange County SC (interim)
- 2021–2023: Orange County SC
- * Club domestic league appearances and goals

Richard David Chaplow (born 2 February 1985) is an English professional football coach and former player who was most recently the head coach of USL Championship side Orange County SC.

Chaplow was a product of the Burnley academy and made his professional debut for the club in April 2003. He joined West Bromwich Albion in 2005. In 2006, Chaplow joined Southampton on loan. He moved to Preston North End in 2008 and had another loan spell with Southampton in 2010 before joining the club permanently a year later. In 2013, Chaplow initially joined Millwall on loan before joining the club permanently. He had a loan spell with Ipswich Town in 2015 before moving to Doncaster Rovers. Chaplow joined Orange County SC in July 2016. He represented his country at youth levels.

In August 2021, Chaplow was named interim head coach of Orange County SC before becoming the permanent head coach in November 2021. He was dismissed from this role in May 2023.

== Club career ==
=== Burnley ===
Chaplow joined Burnley at the age of eight, before earning a scholarship at the club in 2001 as part of the YTS Apprenticeships, turning down offers from Blackburn Rovers and Manchester City.

In 2002–03, part of his season in the reserves was blighted by glandular fever, although he returned to action in January. After being included as an unused substitute against Preston North End on 8 April 2003, Chaplow made his Burnley debut, coming on as a second-half substitute, in 2–0 loss against Norwich City four days later on 12 April 2003. Chaplow then made his first start and played the whole game despite losing, 2–0, against Nottingham Forest on 21 April 2003. He went on to make five appearances for the side in the 2002–03 season.

However, ahead of the 2003–04 season, Chaplow suffered from alopecia during 2003, returning to pre-season training having lost all his hair. Despite this, Chaplow continued to a handful of first-team appearances at the start of the season, playing in the midfielder position, and scored his first goal for the club on 30 August 2003, in a 1–0 win over Crewe Alexandra. As a result, Chaplow signed his first professional contract with the club. By the rest of 2003, Chaplow scored two more goals, which came against Cardiff City and Reading. Chaplow's performance throughout December earned him PFA First Division Player of the Month award. Later in the 2003–04 season, Chaplow scored two more goals, which came against Ipswich Town and Nottingham Forest. Despite missing out through suspension and fitness concerns, Chaplow went on to make thirty–nine appearances and scoring five times in all competitions. At the end of the 2003–04 season, Chaplow signed a contract with the club, keeping him until 2006.

Ahead of the 2004–05 season, Chaplow was subject of a transfer move throughout the summer, with Blackburn Rovers and Leeds United. Despite this, Chaplow ended the transfer speculation when he signed a four–year contract, keeping him until 2008. Throughout September, Chaplow scored two goals in five appearances against Crewe Alexandra and Cardiff City. However, Chaplow was soon sidelined for several months with a cartilage trouble, which he sustained and substituted in the first half, in a 3–0 defeat to Queens Park Rangers on 30 October 2004. After a month out, he made his first team return from injury on 18 December 2004, coming on as a second-half substitute, in a 2–1 loss against Sunderland. In the January transfer window, Chaplow was linked with a move to Premier League side West Brom Albion and had a bid rejected from Burnley shortly after. Amid the transfer speculation, Chaplow's performance against Liverpool in the third round of FA Cup was well-received, with Manager Steve Cotterill praising his performance, which saw Burnley beating them, 1–0. A week later, West Brom Albion made another bid for Chaplow, which was accepted soon after.

=== West Bromwich Albion ===
Chaplow joined West Bromwich Albion for a fee of £1.5 million on transfer deadline day in January 2005. The Baggies had previously attempted to force the deal through several times during the transfer window. He moved to The Hawthorns on a 3 1/2-year deal, with the option of a further season.

Chaplow made his Albion debut in a 4–1 victory over Charlton Athletic at The Valley on 19 March 2005. He won a penalty soon after coming on as a late substitute, enabling Robert Earnshaw to complete his hat-trick from the spot. He would later make four appearances in the 2004–05 season in his first half season at the club.

However, in the 2005–06 season, Chaplow struggled to dispatch the first team place in midfield, with Riccardo Scimeca, Steve Watson and Diomansy Kamara preferred instead and made two appearances at the start of the season. first goals for West Brom came in an FA Cup 3rd round replay at Reading on 17 January 2006. His two first-half goals gave Albion a 2–0 lead, but they eventually lost 3–2 in extra-time. In February 2006, Chaplow signed a three-month loan deal with Championship side Southampton, as part of the deal which saw Nigel Quashie move the other way. Chaplow made his full debut for the side two days later after signing for the club despite losing 2–0 against Reading. On his ninth appearance, he scored his only Saints goal at Brighton & Hove Albion on 8 April 2006, which saw Southampton win 2–0. Two weeks later, Chaplow returned to his parent club after suffering a knee injury.

Upon his return from the loan, Manager Bryan Robson was impressed with his performance and expected use him in the 2006–07 season. Chaplow's first appearance of the season came on 8 August 2006, where he came on as a second-half substitute, in a 1–1 against Cardiff City. He then scored his first league goal for West Bromwich Albion, in a 2–1 defeat at Derby County. However, his appearances in the first team was marred by substitute bench and injuries. Soon, under the new management of Tony Mowbray, Chaplow managed to regain his first team place for the rest of the season, eventually making thirty–five appearances and scoring once in all competitions.

At the start of the 2007–08 season, Chaplow continued to be in the first team regular, but was plagued with a foot injury and find his first team opportunities limited, with good forms from Robert Koren and Filipe Teixeira. As a result, Chaplow was linked a move away from the club, with his former club, Burnley keen on re-signing him. But this was denied by Manager Owen Coyle. After the announcement of his departure was made, Chaplow left West Brom in 2008 after spending three years at the club.

=== Preston North End ===
On 9 January 2008, Chaplow signed for Championship team Preston North End on a three-year contract for £800,000 with a further £550,000 payable based on various performance-related criteria. West Bromwich Albion also inserted a 20% sell-on clause on any future sale.

Three days after signing for the club, Chaplow made his Preston North End debut, making his first start and played for 75 minutes, in a 1–0 win over Watford. Chaplow then scored his first goals for the club on 26 February 2008, in a 2–0 win over Stoke City. However, during the match, he suffered an injury in the second half and was substituted, leaving him out of action for weeks. After returning to the first team from injury, Chaplow then scored his first goal for the club on 19 April 2008, in a 2–2 draw against Plymouth Argyle. He went on to make thirteen appearances and scoring three times in all competitions.

At the start of 2008–09 season, Chaplow started well when he scored two goals against Crystal Palace and Sheffield Wednesday in four league appearances by August. However, throughout September and October, Chaplow was plagued by injuries. He returned to the first team, where he came on as a second-half substitute, setting up one of the goals, in a 2–2 draw against Norwich City on 8 November 2008. Two weeks later, on 22 November 2008, Chaplow scored again, in a 2–1 win over Barnsley. However, as the 2008–09 season progressed, he continued to have a handful of first team appearance despite suffering injuries. Despite this, Chaplow went on to make twenty–seven appearances and scoring three times in all competitions.

In the 2009–10 season, Chaplow continued to be a first team regular and then scored his first goal of the season on 26 September 2009, in a 2–1 win over Leicester City. His second goal then came on 12 December 2009, in a 2–0 win over Plymouth Argyle. As the 2009–10 season progressed, Chaplow remained in the first team despite suffering injuries and suspension. As a result, his appearances was restricted to thirty–five times and scoring two times in all competitions.

With the club facing financial troubles, Chaplow was among eight players to place on a transfer list by Manager Darren Ferguson. In the summer, he was linked a move to newly Premier League promoted side Blackpool.

=== Southampton ===
Having made no appearances for Preston North End in the 2010–11 season, Chaplow joined Southampton once again for an initial one month's loan on 30 September 2010. This was then extended to the end of December.

Three days later after signing for the club, Chaplow made his Southampton debut for the second time, coming on as a second-half substitute and subsequently picked up a yellow card, in a 2–0 win over AFC Bournemouth. Chaplow then scored his first Southampton goal since 2006, in a 4–1 victory over Peterborough United on 20 November 2010. After suffering an achilles injury that kept him out for weeks, he scored on his return in another 4–1 victory, this time over Huddersfield Town on 28 December 2010. On 30 December 2010, it was announced Chaplow had agreed a 2 1/2-year deal for an undisclosed fee. Weeks after signing for the club on a permanent basis, Chaplow scored again on 11 January 2011, in a 6–0 win over Oldham Athletic. He then scored, as well as, setting up one of the goals, in a 4–4 draw against Peterborough United on 5 February 2011. During the match, Chaplow was fouled in the penalty box, giving Southampton a penalty, leading the opposition manager Darren Ferguson accusing him of diving. Later in the 2010–11 season, Chaplow helped the club secure promotion to The Championship after a two years absence, as he made thirty–five appearances and scoring five times in all competitions.

In the 2011–12 season, Chaplow started off his season with a good start when he scored, as well as, setting up two goals, in a 3–1 win over Torquay United in the first round of the League Cup. However, three days later, he was sent–off, in a match against Barnsley after a straight red card, just coming on as a substitute in the 70th minute, which saw Saints 1–0. After serving a three match suspension, Chaplow then scored on 16 September 2011, in a 4–1 win over Birmingham City. By the end of 2011, Chaplow scored two more goals against Peterborough United and Coventry City. However, in a match against Bristol City on 26 November 2011, Chaplow suffered a knee injury early in the first half and was substituted, in a 2–0 loss and was subsequently out for months. Despite making his return, Chaplow continued to be dropped from the first team on three occasions and saw Southampton promoted to the Premier League after a seven years absence. As a result, his appearance was restricted to twenty–eight appearances and scoring four times in all competitions.

With his first team opportunities increasingly limited in the 2012–13 season, Chaplow announced his intention to stay at the club. It wasn't until on 28 August 2012 when he made his first appearance of the season, setting up one of the goals, in a 4–1 win over Stevenage in the second round of League Cup. On 29 September 2012, Chaplow made his first Premier League appearance in six years, coming on as a late substitute, in a 3–1 loss against Everton. For most of the season, Chaplow fell out of favour of the club's first team and was expected to leave the club in January, but it wasn't materialised. It wasn't until on 16 January 2013 when he made his first team return in months, coming on a second-half substitute, in a 2–2 draw against Chelsea.

On 11 July 2013, Southampton Football Club agreed to terminate Chaplow's contract.

=== Millwall ===
On 15 March 2013, Chaplow joined Championship side Millwall on loan until the end of the season. He made his debut the following day, in a 2–0 victory at local rivals, Charlton Athletic, in which he set up one of the goals. Chaplow also set up one of the goals again in the next game on 29 March 2013, which saw Millwall beat Leicester City 1–0. His loan period was cut short following an injury sustained in the 1–1 draw with Birmingham City on 6 April.

On 15 July 2013, Chaplow signed a two-year deal with Millwall following his release by Southampton. Upon joining the club, he was given a number eighteen shirt for the new season. Chaplow's first game after signing for the club on a permanent basis came in the opening game of the season, in a 1–0 loss against Yeovil Town. By the end of August, Chaplow set up two goals in two matches against Sheffield Wednesday and Brighton & Hove Albion. It wasn't until on 1 January 2014 when he scored his first goal for Millwall, in a 3–1 loss against Leicester City. Although he finished the season, making twenty–one appearances and scoring once in all competitions, Chaplow's season was marred by injuries.

However, at the start of the 2014–15 season, Chaplow was sidelined for months, due to a hamstring problems. It wasn't until on 16 September 2014 when he made his return from injury, making his first start, in a 3–2 loss against Reading. Following his return, Chaplow began to play as a right–back position in numerous occasion. After making three appearances in the 2014–15 season, Chaplow was released by the club.

=== Ipswich Town ===
On 20 February 2015, Chaplow signed on loan for a month at Ipswich Town, with an agreement that he could stay until the end of the season.

Chaplow made his Ipswich Town debut four days later, where he came on as a second-half substitute, in a 4–2 win over Birmingham City. On 21 March he scored his first goal for the club, the winner in a 1–0 victory at Watford in the 94th minute. After finishing the season, making six appearances and scoring once, Chaplow returned to his parent following his loan spell came to an end.

=== Doncaster Rovers ===
On 6 July 2015, Chaplow signed for Doncaster Rovers, signing a two–year contract. Upon joining the club, he said joining the club motivated him to do well for the remaining two years there and was given a number eight shirt ahead of a new season.

Chaplow made his Doncaster Rovers debut, in the opening game of the season, where he made his first start for the club before being substituted in the 82nd minute, in a 1–1 draw against Bury. Chaplow then scored, as well as, setting up one of the goals, in a 2–1 win over Barnsley on 3 October 2015. Weeks later, he sidelined for months and it wasn't until on 19 December 2015, where he returned since being absent in October as a late substitute, in a 3–3 draw against Burton Albion. He then scored his second goal for the club on 27 February 2016, in a 1–1 draw against his former club, Millwall. However, in the next match against Swindon Town on 1 March 2016, he was sent–off after a second bookable offence, in a 2–0 loss.

However, throughout most of the season, injuries and suspensions restricted him to making thirty appearances and scoring two times in all competitions. At the end of the 2015–16 season, Chaplow had his relegation clauses in their contracts activated, as a result of Doncaster Rovers relegation. However, Chaplow's contract was terminated by the club.

=== Orange County SC ===
On 29 July 2016, Chaplow signed with United Soccer League side Orange County Blues.

Two days after signing for the club, Chaplow made his Orange County Blues debut, coming on as a second-half substitute, in a 2–0 win over LA Galaxy II. Chaplow scored his first goal for the club in the next game on 4 August 2016, in a 2–1 win over Tulsa Roughnecks. Weeks later, on 21 August 2016, he scored his second goal for the club, in a 2–0 win over LA Galaxy II. After serving a two match suspension, Chaplow returned to the first team and then on 25 September 2016 against Colorado Springs Switchbacks, he set up two goals, in a 4–0 win. In the remainder of the season, Chaplow went on to make ten appearances.

==== Robbie Rogers incident ====
On 21 August 2016, following a 2–0 victory over LA Galaxy II, gay Galaxy player Robbie Rogers wrote on his Facebook page that: "In the heat of the last fifteen minutes of the game a player from the opposing team called me a 'queer' repeatedly". After a league investigation, Chaplow was suspended for two games and fined an undisclosed amount. Following the league's findings, Chaplow denied accusations that he had used homophobic language, claiming: "I have been banned for swearing at a player, not homophobic slurs. At no point in the statement is a homophobic slur made reference to, and the simple reason for this is it didn't happen.".

== International career ==
Chaplow has represented England internationally at a number of age groups including at under-19 level, as well as at under-20 level.

On 22 January 2004, Chaplow was called up by England under-19 for the first time. Chaplow made his only England U19 appearance on 30 March 2004, in a 1–1 draw against Germany U19.

Chaplow has also made one appearance for England under-21s. He became Burnley's first ever England under-21 international in February 2004, when he came off the bench on his debut against the Netherlands at the KC Stadium.

After being in training for the England U20 side in August 2004, Chaplow was called up by the side for the first time on 11 October 2004. Chaplow then scored his first England U20 goal, in a friendly match against Netherlands U20 side. In October 2005 he captained the England under-20 side to a 2–2 draw with the Netherlands, in a match played at his former club Burnley's Turf Moor ground.

== Coaching career ==
In August 2021, after three seasons as an assistant coach with Orange County SC, Chaplow was named interim head coach of the club.

On 9 November 2021, Orange County removed the interim tag and made Chaplow the permanent head coach. Chaplow would lead OCSC to finish second in the Pacific Division, and advance to the USL Championship Final defeating Tampa Bay Rowdies at home, 3–1 in regulation.

Chaplow was dismissed on 1 May 2023 after picking up just six points from the opening eight matches of the season.

== Personal life ==
Growing up, Chaplow attended Mount Carmel Roman Catholic High School and supported Burnley. Like Chaplow, his family are also Burnley supporters.

Chaplow is married to Emily Chaplow and the couple has two sons. In 2013, Chaplow suffered a tragedy when they lost a baby boy.

== Career statistics ==
Appearances and goals by club, season and competition
Club	Season	League			National cup		League cup		Other		Total	
Club	Season	Division	Apps	Goals	Apps	Goals	Apps	Goals	Apps	Goals	Apps	Goals
Burnley	2002–03	First Division	5	0	0	0	0	0	—		5	0
Burnley	2003–04	First Division	39	5	3	0	2	0	—		44	5
Burnley	2004–05	Championship	21	2	2	0	2	0	—		25	2
Burnley	Total		65	7	5	0	4	0	—		74	7
West Bromwich Albion	2004–05	Premier League	4	0	—		—		—		4	0
West Bromwich Albion	2005–06	Premier League	7	0	1	2	3	0	—		11	2
West Bromwich Albion	2006–07	Championship	28	1	4	0	3	0	1 (Note: Appearance in Championship play-offs)	0	36	1
West Bromwich Albion	2007–08	Championship	5	0	0	0	2	0	—		7	0
West Bromwich Albion	Total		44	1	5	2	8	0	1	0	58	3
Southampton (loan)	2005–06	Championship	11	1	—		—		—		11	1
Preston North End	2007–08	Championship	12	3	1	0	—		—		13	3
Preston North End	2008–09	Championship	25	3	1	0	1	0	0	0	27	3
Preston North End	2009–10	Championship	31	2	2	0	2	0	—		35	2
Preston North End	Total		68	8	4	0	3	0	0	0	75	8
Southampton	2010–11	League One	33	4	2	1	0	0	0	0	35	5
Southampton	2011–12	Championship	25	3	1	0	2	1	—		28	4
Southampton	2012–13	Premier League	3	0	0	0	3	0	—		6	0
Southampton	Total		61	7	3	1	5	1	0	0	69	9
Millwall (loan)	2012–13	Championship	4	0	—		—		—		4	0
Millwall	2013–14	Championship	19	1	1	0	1	0	—		21	1
Millwall	2014–15	Championship	7	0	2	0	1	0	—		10	0
Millwall	Total		30	1	3	0	2	0	—		35	1
Ipswich Town (loan)	2014–15	Championship	6	1	—		—		—		6	1
Doncaster Rovers	2015–16	League One	16	1	1	0	1	0	1 (Note: Appearance in Football League Trophy)	0	19	1
Orange County SC	2016	USL	8	2	0	0	—		2 (Note: Appearances in USL Playoffs)	0	10	2
Orange County SC	2017	USL	20	0	2	0	—		—		22	0
Orange County SC	2018	USL	21	2	1	0	—		3	0	25	2
Orange County SC	Total		49	4	3	0	0	0	5	0	57	4
Career total			350	31	24	3	23	1	7	0	404	35

== Honours ==
=== Player ===
Southampton

- Football League One runner-up: 2010–11
- Football League Championship runner-up: 2011–12

Orange County SC

- Western Conference: 2018

Individual

- Football League Championship Player of the Month: August 2008

=== Manager ===
Orange County SC

- USL Championship: 2021
