= Paul McShane (footballer) =

Irish footballer (born 1986)

- McShane with Reading in 2016

Personal information
- Full name: Paul David McShane
- Date of birth: 6 January 1986 (age 40)
- Place of birth: Wicklow, Ireland
- Height: 6 ft 0 in (1.83 m)
- Position: Defender

Team information
- Current team: Lincoln City (first team coach)

Youth career
- Greystones United
- –2002: St Joseph's Boys
- 2002–2004: Manchester United

Senior career*
Years	Team	Apps	(Gls)
2004–2006	Manchester United	0	(0)
2004–2005	→ Walsall (loan)	4	(1)
2005–2006	→ Brighton & Hove Albion (loan)	38	(4)
2006–2007	West Bromwich Albion	32	(2)
2007–2009	Sunderland	24	(0)
2008–2009	→ Hull City (loan)	17	(1)
2009–2015	Hull City	102	(3)
2011	→ Barnsley (loan)	10	(1)
2012	→ Crystal Palace (loan)	11	(0)
2015–2019	Reading	96	(3)
2019–2021	Rochdale	35	(0)
2021–2022	Manchester United	0	(0)
Total		369	(16)

International career^{‡}
2005–2006	Republic of Ireland U21	6	(1)
2006–2016	Republic of Ireland	33	(0)
- * Club domestic league appearances and goals as of 00:10, 01 July 2021 (UTC) ‡ National team caps and goals as of 15:28, 31 August 2018 (UTC)

Paul David McShane (born 6 January 1986) is an Irish professional football coach and former player. He is currently a first team coach at EFL Championship team Lincoln City.

Born in Wicklow, Ireland, McShane moved to England when he was 16 to play for Manchester United, with whom he won the 2003 FA Youth Cup. He had loan stints with Walsall and Brighton & Hove Albion before making a permanent move to West Bromwich Albion in 2006. He joined Sunderland a year later, but spent the 2008–09 season on loan to Hull City before making a permanent move there in 2009. He spent six years with Hull, broken up by loan spells with Barnsley and Crystal Palace, before joining Reading in 2015. After four years with Reading, he moved to Rochdale but was released following the COVID-19 pandemic in July 2021, when he made a return to Manchester United as a player-coach for the club's under-23s team. He retired from playing at the end of the season, when he took up a youth coaching role full-time.

McShane represented the Republic of Ireland at every level from Under-15s upwards. He made six appearances for the under-21s before making his debut for the senior team in 2006. He was named in the Ireland squad for UEFA Euro 2012, but did not make an appearance at the tournament. He earned his 33rd and final cap in March 2016, although he was named as a standby player for UEFA Euro 2016.

== Early life ==
Born in Wicklow, County Wicklow, McShane started his career with Greystones United, as well as playing for Newtown Juniors and his secondary school, St. David's. He later joined St Joseph's Boys, a club based in south Dublin.

== Club career ==
=== Manchester United ===
In the summer of 2002, he signed for Manchester United. In December 2004, he was loaned to Walsall, where he played four league matches and scored once against Sheffield Wednesday. He played for Manchester United in the final of the 2003 FA Youth Cup in which they defeated Middlesbrough 3–1.

He played in pre-season friendly matches and was given the squad number 34, but did not make a full debut for Manchester United.

=== Brighton & Hove Albion ===
In August 2005, he moved to Brighton & Hove Albion on an initial five-month loan deal. The loan was later extended for the whole of the 2005–06 season. McShane was voted Player of the Season by the supporters, as well as the away supporters' Player of the Season.

=== West Bromwich Albion ===
On 10 August 2006, McShane and fellow 2003 FA Youth Cup winner Luke Steele moved to West Bromwich Albion on a permanent basis in a deal that saw Tomasz Kuszczak join United on a season-long loan with a permanent deal confirmed for the following summer. He made his debut for West Brom in a 3–0 win over Leyton Orient in the League Cup on 24 August 2006. His goal against Leeds United in the FA Cup on 6 January 2007 sent Albion on their way to a 3–1 victory. It was the first of three goals he scored in 42 appearances for the club.

=== Sunderland ===
On 26 July 2007, McShane joined Sunderland for an initial £1.5 million fee. McShane's first match for the Black Cats ended in success – his performance helping Sunderland to a clean sheet and a 1–0 win over Tottenham Hotspur.

=== Hull City ===
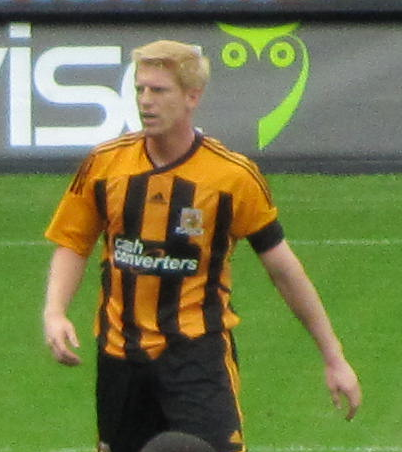
McShane playing for Hull City in 2011

On 29 August 2008, Sunderland accepted a loan offer for McShane from Hull City, who were newly promoted to the Premier League. While playing for Hull, he scored the opening goal at Anfield in a league match versus Liverpool on 13 December 2008. His last match during his loan spell for Hull was an FA Cup victory over Newcastle United on 14 January 2009, as he was recalled to Sunderland by manager Ricky Sbragia.

On 30 August 2009, McShane rejoined Hull on a permanent transfer for an undisclosed fee. On 16 February 2011, he joined Barnsley on a two-month loan, but Hull were given the option to recall him after 28 days. He scored his first goal for Barnsley in a 4–2 win over Bristol City on 9 April 2011.

On 13 January 2012, McShane joined Crystal Palace on a one-month loan. McShane's loan at Palace was extended until the end of the 2011–12 season on 31 January 2012.

The 2012–13 season started more positively for McShane than his previous few seasons at Hull as he enjoyed regular appearances under new manager Steve Bruce, often being deployed as part of Hull's new system of a three-man defence. He scored his first goal in over four years on 1 December 2012, shouldering the ball home to help Hull to a 2–1 victory at Nottingham Forest. More solid performances at the heart of the Tigers' defence followed for McShane in 27 appearances that season, until he was ruled out for the rest of the campaign with ankle ligament damage suffered in a match, again against Nottingham Forest. With his contract running out at the end of the season, this injury put McShane's long-term future at the club in doubt. However, McShane returned to the team unexpectedly before the end of the season. On 4 May 2013, McShane started on the final day of the season in a match against Cardiff City, a match which the Tigers had to win to guarantee promotion to the Premier League. In the 63rd minute of the match, an inswinging corner from Robbie Brady was met by the right foot of McShane, who saw the ball nestle in the corner of the net to give his team the lead. This meant the Irishman had potentially scored the goal to promote Hull (although Watford's subsequent loss to Leeds United meant they achieved this regardless). In the aftermath of the match, Stephen Quinn, talking of his teammate, said "Mac's my age and I want to be like him. I want to structure my life like him. He dedicates his whole life to playing. He's had knock-downs in the past but that's the measure of the man. That's why I like him even more, he comes back from anything like that. He's an almighty man who you want in the trenches wherever you go." Steve Bruce later confirmed that McShane would be offered a new contract for the next season in the top flight. On 8 July 2013, McShane signed a new two-year deal with Hull City.

McShane's 2013–14 Premier League season started slowly as he was mainly named as a substitute for the opening two months of the campaign, but was finally included in the starting eleven away against Tottenham, a match in which he was successful in keeping the home side out up until a controversial 80th-minute penalty. He started the next match, again away at Tottenham but this time in the League Cup three days later, and put in a similarly impressive performance, scoring a header in the 99th minute past a helpless Brad Friedel. He followed this up next Saturday with another impressive display, earning the Tigers a clean sheet in a 1–0 win over Sunderland. On 17 May 2014, he played as a substitute in the 2014 FA Cup Final against Arsenal.

On 28 May 2015, Hull City released McShane and five other players who were out of contract at the end of the 2014–15 season.

=== Reading ===
On 2 July 2015, McShane signed a three-year contract with Reading. He made his first professional appearance for the Royals on 8 August 2015 in a 2–1 defeat away to Birmingham City. McShane's first goal for Reading came during a 3–1 victory against his former club West Bromwich Albion on 20 February 2016, where he scored the equaliser during the FA Cup Fifth Round match at the Madejski Stadium.

He was released by Reading at the end of the 2018–19 season.

=== Rochdale ===
On 10 October 2019, it was announced that McShane had joined League One side Rochdale on a short-term contract until January 2020. This was extended by 18 months in mid-January 2020.

=== Return to Manchester United ===
On 23 July 2021, he returned to former club Manchester United as a player-coach, with the intention of being used as an overage player in under-21s matches while coaching in the youth set-up. He played in the 2021–22 EFL Trophy wearing the number 62, but retired from playing at the end of the season and took up a full-time role as the club's Professional Development Phase coach.

== International career ==
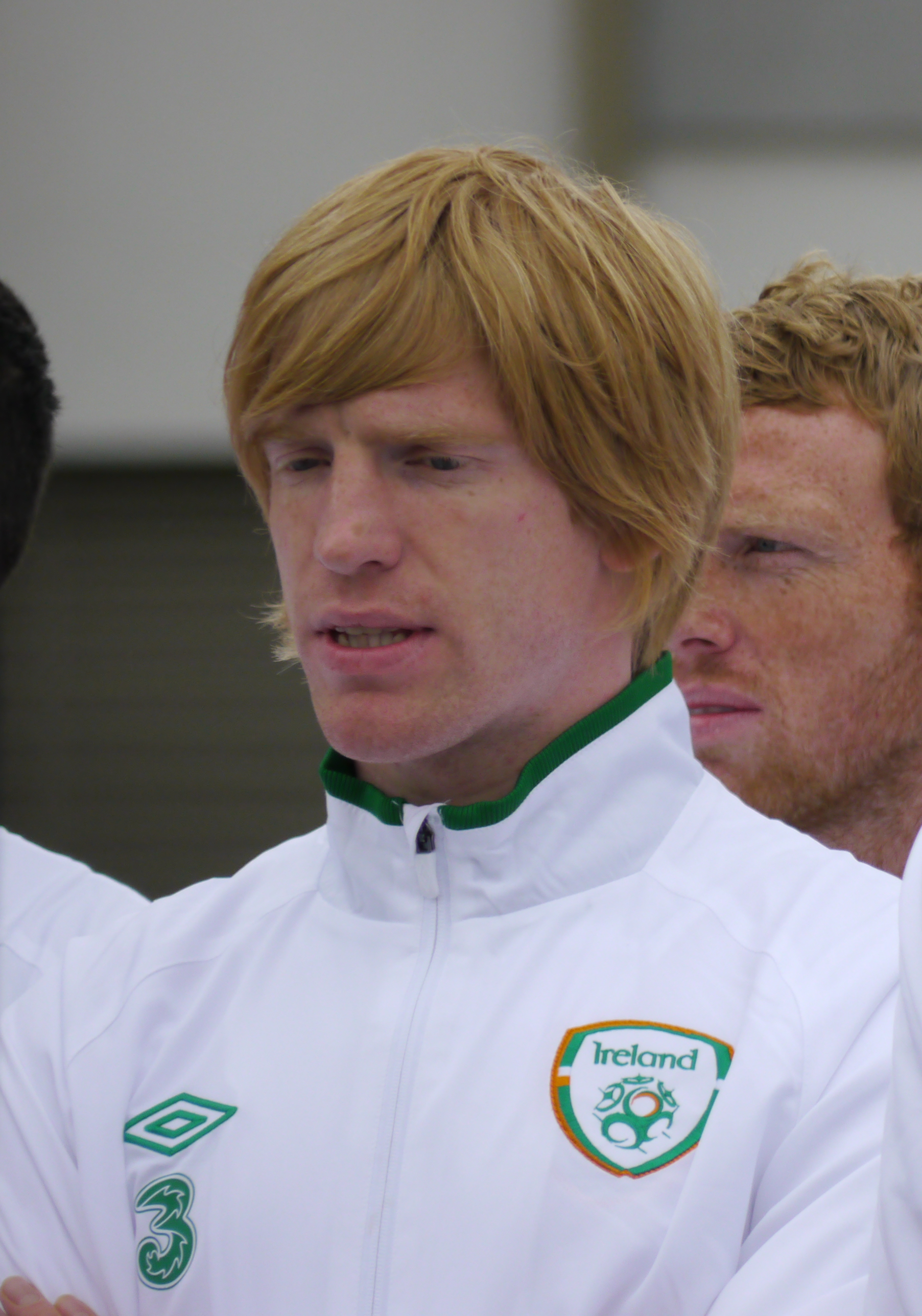
McShane with the Republic of Ireland in 2012

McShane received his first senior international call-up to the Republic of Ireland squad from manager Steve Staunton on 25 September 2006, for the UEFA Euro 2008 qualifiers against Cyprus and the Czech Republic. An injury to Andy O'Brien and the suspension of Richard Dunne (the two central defenders that had started the match against Cyprus) meant that McShane was given his first international cap against the Czech Republic on 11 October 2006. The match ended in a 1–1 draw, with McShane being named man of the match. McShane was part of the team that missed out on place at the 2010 FIFA World Cup after being defeated by France in Paris in a play-off, and was the Irish player directly behind Thierry Henry when Henry twice handballed late in extra-time before crossing for William Gallas to score an illegitimate, but accepted, goal.

On 29 May 2012, he was called in from the international wilderness to the Irish UEFA Euro 2012 squad following an injury to Kevin Foley ahead of the tournament.

== Style of play ==
Eamon Dunphy once compared McShane to Spanish international defender Sergio Ramos, labelling Sergio Ramos "...like Paul McShane on steroids".

== Coaching career ==
In June 2025, McShane joined League One side Huddersfield Town as an assistant coach.

On 10 July 2026, McShane joined the new backroom staff of Chris Cohen and Tom Shaw at Championship club Lincoln City as their new first-team coach.

== Career statistics ==
=== Club ===
As of match played 13 October 2021

Appearances and goals by club, season and competition
Club	Season	League			FA Cup		League Cup		Other		Total	
Club	Season	Division	Apps	Goals	Apps	Goals	Apps	Goals	Apps	Goals	Apps	Goals
Manchester United	2004–05	Premier League	0	0	0	0	0	0	0	0	0	0
Manchester United	2005–06	Premier League	0	0	—		—		—		0	0
Manchester United	Total		0	0	0	0	0	0	0	0	0	0
Walsall (loan)	2004–05	League One	4	1	—		—		—		4	1
Brighton & Hove Albion (loan)	2005–06	Championship	38	4	1	0	1	0	—		40	4
West Bromwich Albion	2006–07	Championship	32	2	4	1	3	0	3 (Note: Appearance(s) in Championship play-offs)	0	42	3
Sunderland	2007–08	Premier League	21	0	1	0	0	0	—		22	0
Sunderland	2008–09	Premier League	3	0	0	0	0	0	—		3	0
Sunderland	2009–10	Premier League	0	0	—		0	0	—		0	0
Sunderland	Total		24	0	1	0	0	0	—		25	0
Hull City (loan)	2008–09	Premier League	17	1	2	0	—		—		19	1
Hull City	2009–10	Premier League	27	0	0	0	1	0	—		28	0
Hull City	2010–11	Championship	19	0	0	0	1	0	—		20	0
Hull City	2011–12	Championship	1	0	1	0	—		—		2	0
Hull City	2012–13	Championship	25	2	3	0	1	0	—		29	2
Hull City	2013–14	Premier League	10	0	3	0	2	1	—		15	1
Hull City	2014–15	Premier League	20	1	1	0	1	0	1 (Note: Appearance in UEFA Europa League)	0	23	1
Hull City	Total		119	4	10	0	6	1	1	0	136	5
Barnsley (loan)	2010–11	Championship	10	1	—		—		—		10	1
Crystal Palace (loan)	2011–12	Championship	11	0	—		1	0	—		12	0
Reading	2015–16	Championship	35	0	3	1	2	0	—		40	1
Reading	2016–17	Championship	30	3	0	0	0	0	1	0	31	3
Reading	2017–18	Championship	26	0	1	0	0	0	—		27	0
Reading	2018–19	Championship	5	0	0	0	0	0	—		5	0
Reading	Total		96	3	4	1	2	0	1	0	103	4
Rochdale	2019–20	League One	16	0	1	1	0	0	0	0	17	1
Rochdale	2020–21	League One	19	0	0	0	1	0	0	0	20	0
Rochdale	Total		35	0	1	1	1	0	0	0	37	1
Manchester United	2021–22	Premier League	0	0	0	0	0	0	0	0	0	0
Manchester United U21	2021–22	—			—		—		2 (Note: Appearance(s) in the EFL Trophy)	0	2	0
Career total			369	15	21	3	14	1	7	0	411	19

=== International ===
As of match played 29 March 2016

Appearances and goals by national team and year
National team	Year	Apps	Goals
Republic of Ireland	2006	2	0
Republic of Ireland	2007	7	0
Republic of Ireland	2008	5	0
Republic of Ireland	2009	6	0
Republic of Ireland	2010	3	0
Republic of Ireland	2011	3	0
Republic of Ireland	2012	2	0
Republic of Ireland	2013	3	0
Republic of Ireland	2014	0	0
Republic of Ireland	2015	1	0
Republic of Ireland	2016	1	0
Total		33	0

== Honours ==
Manchester United U18

- FA Youth Cup: 2002–03

Hull City

- Football League Championship runner-up: 2012–13
- FA Cup runner-up: 2013–14

Republic of Ireland

- Nations Cup: 2011
