= Darren Carter =

English footballer (born 1983)

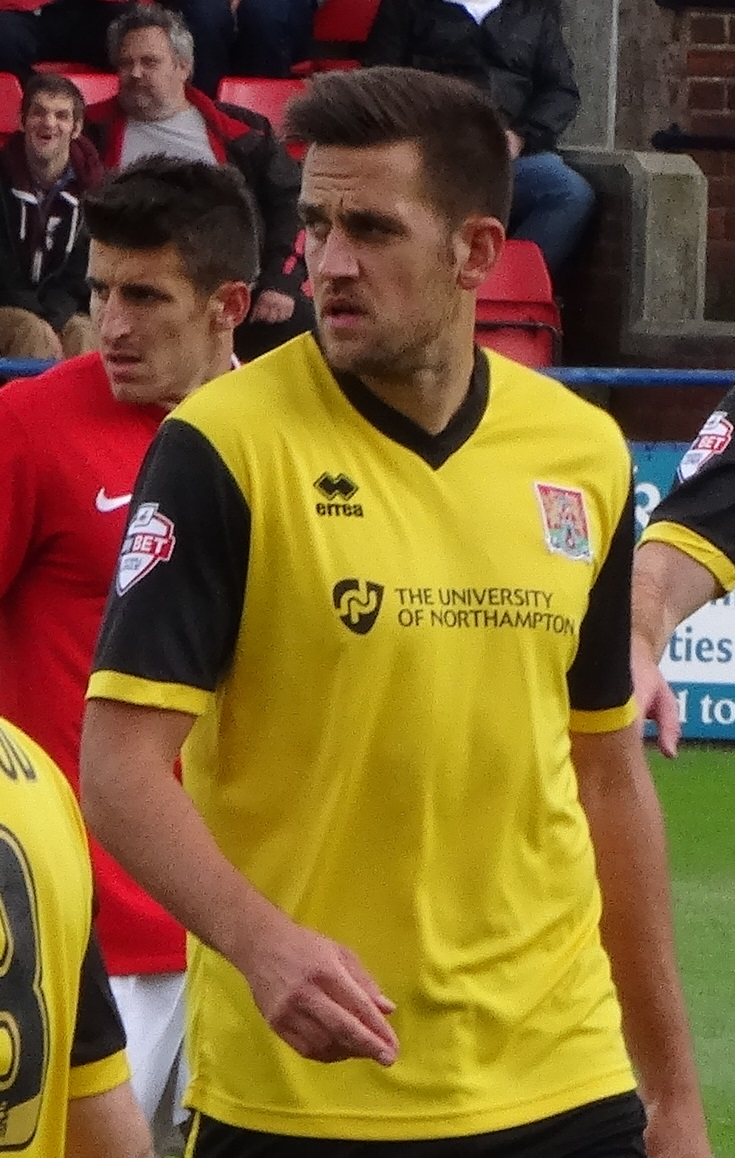
- Carter playing for Northampton Town in 2014

Personal information
- Full name: Darren Anthony Carter
- Date of birth: 18 December 1983 (age 42)
- Place of birth: Solihull, England
- Height: 6 ft 2 in (1.88 m)
- Position: Central midfielder

Youth career
- 1998–2001: Birmingham City

Senior career*
Years	Team	Apps	(Gls)
2001–2005	Birmingham City	45	(3)
2004	→ Sunderland (loan)	10	(1)
2005–2007	West Bromwich Albion	53	(4)
2007–2011	Preston North End	94	(4)
2010–2011	→ Millwall (loan)	10	(0)
2012–2013	Cheltenham Town	34	(6)
2013–2015	Northampton Town	60	(6)
2015–2017	Forest Green Rovers	62	(11)
2017–2021	Solihull Moors	118	(10)
Total		486	(45)

International career
2002	England U19	2	(0)
2002–2003	England U20	11	(0)

Managerial career
- 2021–2022: Birmingham City Women (interim)
- 2022–2024: Birmingham City Women
- * Club domestic league appearances and goals

Darren Anthony Carter (born 18 December 1983) is an English football coach and former professional player. Primarily a central midfielder, Carter made more than 300 appearances in the Premier League and Football League over a 14-year career, and then spent a further six seasons playing in the National League. He was most recently head coach of FA Women's Championship club Birmingham City Women.

An England under-19 and under-20 international, Carter began his career with Birmingham City, and came to prominence at the age of 18 when his penalty in the 2002 play-off final clinched the club's promotion to the Premier League. He was loaned to Sunderland in winter 2004, before he was sold to West Bromwich Albion for £1.5 million in July 2005. In August 2007, he joined Preston North End for a fee of up to £1.25 million. Loaned to Millwall in the 2010–11 season, he later had to spend the 2011–12 season without a club after tearing a groin muscle during a trial match. He returned to action in the 2012–13 campaign with Cheltenham Town, and then spent two seasons with Northampton Town. He spent the next two seasons with Forest Green Rovers of the National League and a further four with Solihull Moors.

While with Solihull Moors, he managed their youth academy and acted as a development coach, and spent time as first-team coach of West Bromwich Albion Women, before taking up the post of interim head coach of FA WSL club Birmingham City Women in November 2021. He was upgraded to permanent head coach at the end of May 2022, and left the club towards the end of the 2023–24 season.

== Club career ==
=== Birmingham City ===
Carter was born in Solihull, West Midlands. He made his first-team debut for Birmingham City in the First Division at the age of 18 in a 1–0 defeat to local rivals West Bromwich Albion at The Hawthorns on 29 January 2002. He scored his first goal in senior football on 10 April, helping the Blues to secure a play-off spot with a 3–1 victory over Crewe Alexandra at St Andrew's. On 12 May, he made himself a Birmingham City hero when he scored the decisive penalty in the shoot-out to win the play-off final against Norwich City at the Millennium Stadium. The match had finished 1–1 after extra time.

Carter played only 12 Premier League matches in the 2002–03 season, with half of these appearances coming before mid-October. His first team opportunities were even more restricted in the 2003–04 campaign, as he featured in just five Premier League matches. Despite this, he signed a three-and-a-half-year contract in January 2004 after 20 months of negotiations. In March 2004 he was scheduled to go out on loan to Rotherham United before injuries and suspensions at Birmingham persuaded manager Steve Bruce to put an end to the deal.

He was loaned to Sunderland in September 2004. Carter scored on his debut, in a 3–1 victory over Preston North End at the Stadium of Light on 18 September. He made nine further appearances for the club before being recalled by Birmingham on 6 December. This gave his Birmingham career the boost it needed, and he was seen as a vital member of the squad until his July 2005 transfer to West Bromwich Albion for £1.5 million. At the end of the 2004–05 season, Sunderland won promotion to the Premier League as champions of the Championship.

=== West Bromwich Albion ===
Carter made his West Bromwich Albion debut at The Hawthorns in a 3–2 defeat to his former club Birmingham on 27 August 2005. He initially struggled to make the bench, and on 11 October manager Bryan Robson said that he "is still very much in my thoughts at this time". He scored his first goal for the club four days later with a 20-yard (18 m) volley in a 2–1 victory over Arsenal; the strike won him the club's Goal-of-the-Season Award. The "Baggies" were relegated at the end of the 2005–06 season, and Carter was singled out for booing by the home crowd.

He made 33 appearances in the Championship in the 2006–07 season, and was used as a substitute in the play-off final defeat to Derby County at Wembley Stadium, replacing Zoltán Gera on 71 minutes.

=== Preston North End ===
After manager Tony Mowbray confirmed that Carter could not be guaranteed first-team football at West Bromwich Albion, he signed a four-year deal with Preston North End, managed by Paul Simpson. The move was completed on 9 August 2007, for an initial £750,000 fee with potential to rise to £1.25m, and the contract included a 20% sell-on clause. Carter made his Preston debut in a 0–0 draw with Norwich City at Deepdale two days later, and his performance earned him a place in the Championship Team of the Week. In February 2008, Carter scored a 93rd-minute own goal for Portsmouth to knock Preston out of the FA Cup at the fifth round stage. He finished the 2007–08 campaign with 43 appearances.

Manager Alan Irvine started Carter in just eight matches in the following season, and the midfielder later admitted the season was "nothing short of a disaster for me personally". Preston reached the play-off semi-finals, but lost 2–1 on aggregate to Sheffield United. Carter was transfer-listed at the end of the 2009–10 season after complaining of a lack of first-team opportunities under new manager Darren Ferguson.

In July 2010 he spent a week on trial with Millwall, but a proposed six-month loan move fell through. He then joined Southampton on trial. On 4 August, he joined Kenny Jackett's Millwall on a three-month loan. He made his debut on the opening day of the new season, and was sent off for two bookable offences as his new club won 3–0 away at Bristol City. The loan deal was extended to January. He made five starts and six substitute appearances for the Lions.

On his return from loan, Carter went straight into Preston's starting eleven under new manager Phil Brown. He opened the scoring in the FA Cup-tie against Nottingham Forest, his first match for Preston for nine months; Forest won 2–1. After Preston were relegated to League One and Carter's contract expired at the end of the 2010–11 season, he trained with the club during July, but no terms were agreed on a new deal.

Carter began training with former club Birmingham City in August in the hope of earning a contract, but after no deal was forthcoming he had a trial in October with fellow Championship club Brighton & Hove Albion, but manager Gus Poyet told him he was looking for a more physical type of midfielder. While playing for Nottingham Forest reserves in November as part of another trial, Carter tore a groin muscle, requiring surgery and a three-month recovery period. Once he regained fitness towards the end of the 2011–12 season, he played for Walsall's reserves, and returned to Birmingham City for pre-season training.

=== Cheltenham Town ===
In August 2012, Carter signed a six-month contract with League Two club Cheltenham Town. He re-signed with the "Robins" in January, to keep him at Whaddon Road until the end of the 2012–13 season. Cheltenham reached the play-off semi-finals, where they were beaten by Northampton Town; Carter was an unused substitute in both legs. In May 2013, he was released by Cheltenham after manager Mark Yates admitted that he could not meet the player's wage demands. Carter denied this was the case, saying no contract negotiations took place and that he was left out of the crucial end-of-season run-in without any explanation.

=== Northampton Town ===
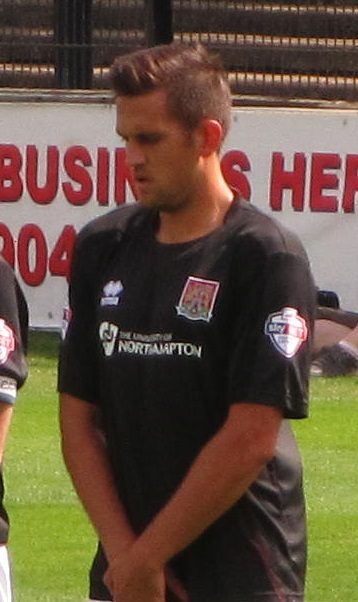
Carter playing for Northampton Town in 2013

Carter signed a two-year contract with Northampton Town in July 2013. The club were still in League Two, having lost the play-off final to Bradford City. In his competitive debut for Northampton, at York City in the opening match of the campaign, he was sent off for a second bookable offence with 18 minutes to play, and his team lost 1–0 thanks to a last-minute goal. After two seasons at the club, and failing to hold down a first team place in 2014–15, Carter was released by manager Chris Wilder.

=== Forest Green Rovers ===
On 22 September 2015, Carter signed for National League leaders Forest Green Rovers on a free transfer for the remainder of the season. He made his debut against his former club, second-placed Cheltenham Town, that same evening; the match ended as a 2–2 draw. He continued in the starting eleven, and on his fourth appearance, his shot from the edge of the penalty area opened the scoring in the 3–0 win away to Aldershot Town. He scored his second goal for the club in an FA Cup first round away win over Football League club AFC Wimbledon on 7 November.

He helped Forest Green reach the 2016 National League play-off final at Wembley Stadium on 15 May 2016, and played the full 90 minutes in a 3–1 loss to Grimsby Town that denied the club a place in the Football League. The following day, newly appointed manager Mark Cooper offered him a new contract, of one year, which he accepted.

He scored his first goal of the 2016–17 National League season on 27 August 2016 in a 4–1 win away to Maidstone United. He made 29 league appearances, scoring 4 goals, as Forest Green finished in the play-off positions. On 3 May 2017 – after the end of the regular season but before the play-offs – the club confirmed that Carter's contract had been terminated by mutual consent.

=== Solihull Moors ===
On 28 June 2017, Carter signed for National League club Solihull Moors on a free transfer. He went into the campaign "with the attitude that I am going to play 40-odd games", and proceeded to do so. He was appointed captain, and missed only one match over the season as the team finished in the lower half of mid-table. Ahead of the 2018–19 season, he signed a one-year playing contract and was appointed manager of the club's youth academy. He remained a regular in the team, playing in 44 of the 46 league matches as Moors finished second, three points behind Leyton Orient, and lost to AFC Fylde in the play-off semi-final. His consistency of performance earned him a place in the National League Team of the Season alongside Moors team-mate Jamey Osborne. On 3 June 2021, it was announced that Carter had left the club.

== International career ==
Carter represented the England under-20 team at the 2003 FIFA World Youth Championship, and was capped 11 times in all at that level. In one match he was sent off for a foul on Portugal's Cristiano Ronaldo.

== Style of play ==
Speaking in July 2005, Bryan Robson stated that Carter "has very good stamina and is very much a box-to-box player who can play in the centre of midfield or wide on the left. He is also left footed which gives us good balance in the squad, he has a good presence".

== Coaching career ==
While a player with Solihull Moors, he managed the club's academy, and also acted as a youth development coach. He spent time in the early part of the 2021–22 season as first-team coach of West Bromwich Albion Women, before taking on the role of interim head coach of FA WSL club Birmingham City Women on 21 November 2021 following the dismissal of Scott Booth. After being unable to avoid relegation to the FA Women's Championship, his role as head coach became permanent on 30 May 2022 after a two-year deal was signed. The team fell just one point short of promotion in 2022–23, and Carter left the club by mutual consent in April 2024.

== Career statistics ==
Appearances and goals by club, season and competition
Club	Season	League			FA Cup		League Cup		Other		Total	
Club	Season	Division	Apps	Goals	Apps	Goals	Apps	Goals	Apps	Goals	Apps	Goals
Birmingham City	2001–02	First Division	13	1	0	0	0	0	2 (Note: Appearances in First Division play-offs)	0	15	1
Birmingham City	2002–03	Premier League	12	0	0	0	1	0	—		13	0
Birmingham City	2003–04	Premier League	5	0	3	0	0	0	—		8	0
Birmingham City	2004–05	Premier League	15	2	2	2	—		—		17	4
Birmingham City	Total		45	3	5	2	1	0	2	0	53	5
Sunderland (loan)	2004–05	Championship	10	1	—		—		—		10	1
West Bromwich Albion	2005–06	Premier League	20	1	2	0	3	0	—		25	1
West Bromwich Albion	2006–07	Championship	33	3	3	1	3	1	2 (Note: Appearances in Championship play-offs)	0	41	5
West Bromwich Albion	Total		53	4	5	1	6	1	2	0	66	6
Preston North End	2007–08	Championship	39	4	1	0	3	0	—		43	4
Preston North End	2008–09	Championship	18	0	2	0	0	0	2	0	22	0
Preston North End	2009–10	Championship	23	0	2	1	3	0	—		28	1
Preston North End	2010–11	Championship	14	0	1	1	—		—		15	1
Preston North End	Total		94	4	6	2	6	0	2	0	108	6
Millwall (loan)	2010–11	Championship	10	0	—		1	0	—		11	0
Cheltenham Town	2012–13	League Two	34	6	3	0	0	0	1 (Note: Appearance(s) in Football League Trophy)	0	38	6
Northampton Town	2013–14	League Two	37	5	0	0	0	0	1	0	38	5
Northampton Town	2014–15	League Two	23	1	2	0	0	0	2	0	27	1
Northampton Town	Total		60	6	2	0	0	0	3	0	65	6
Forest Green Rovers	2015–16	National League	33	7	3	1	—		3 (Note: Appearances in National League play-offs)	0	39	8
Forest Green Rovers	2016–17	National League	29	4	1	0	—		3 (Note: Appearance(s) in FA Trophy)	1	33	5
Forest Green Rovers	Total		62	11	4	1	—		6	1	72	13
Solihull Moors	2017–18	National League	45	7	3	1	—		1	0	49	8
Solihull Moors	2018–19	National League	44	3	3	0	—		5 (Note: Four appearances in FA Trophy, one in National League play-offs)	0	52	3
Solihull Moors	2019–20	National League	18	0	0	0	—		3 (Note: Two appearances and one goal in Scottish Challenge Cup, one appearance in FA Trophy)	1	21	1
Solihull Moors	2020–21	National League	11	0	1	0	—		0	0	12	0
Solihull Moors	Total		118	10	7	1	—		9	1	134	12
Career total			486	45	32	7	14	1	25	2	557	55

== Honours ==
Birmingham City

- Football League First Division play-offs: 2002

Individual

- National League Team of the Season: 2018–19
