= Tomasz Kuszczak =

Polish footballer (born 1982)

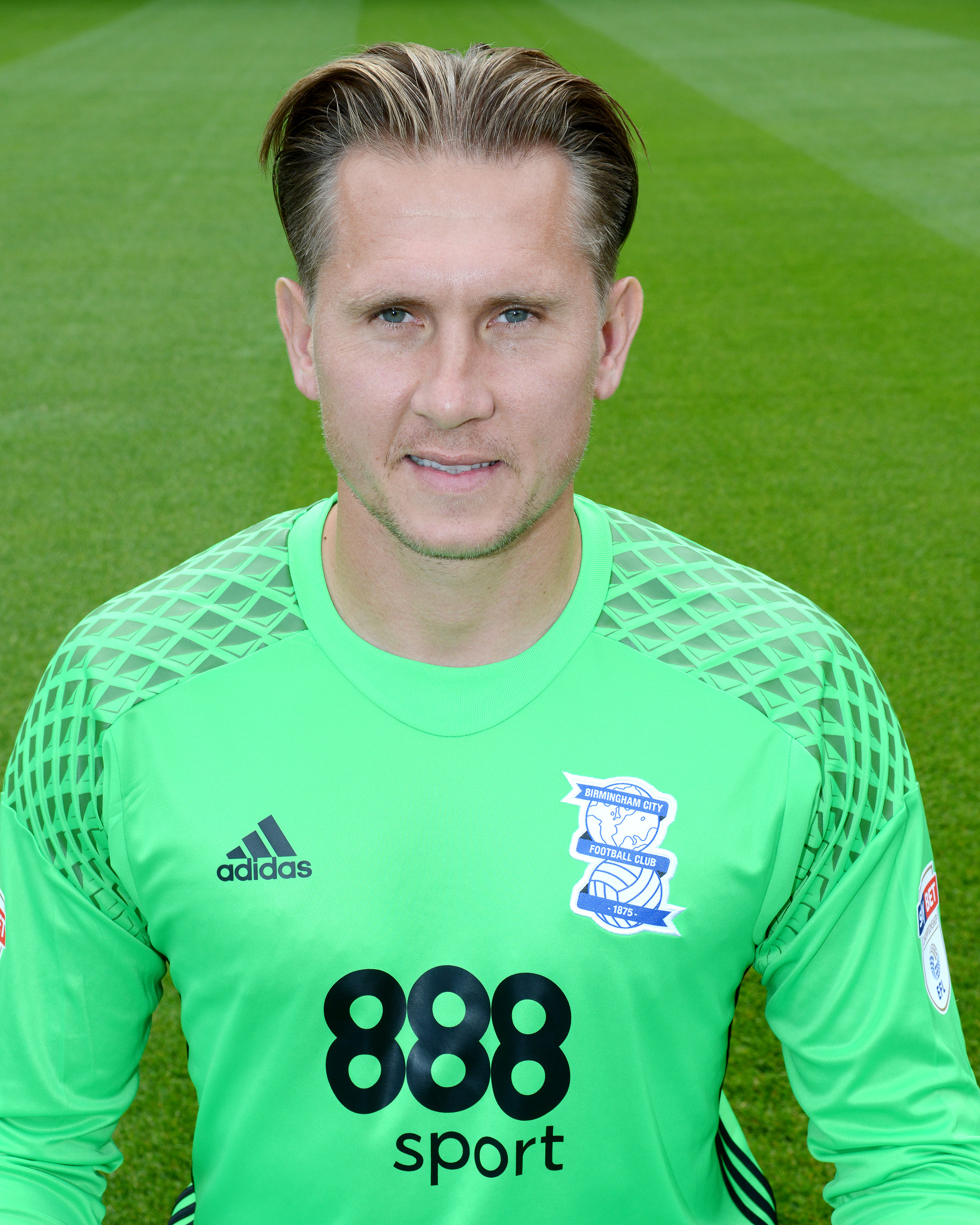
- Kuszczak in 2016 with Birmingham City

Personal information
- Full name: Tomasz Mirosław Kuszczak
- Date of birth: 20 March 1982 (age 44)
- Place of birth: Krosno Odrzańskie, Poland
- Height: 1.91 m (6 ft 3 in)
- Position: Goalkeeper

Youth career
- 1998–1999: Śląsk Wrocław
- 1999–2000: Uerdingen

Senior career*
Years	Team	Apps	(Gls)
2000–2004	Hertha BSC II	87	(0)
2001–2004	Hertha BSC	0	(0)
2004–2007	West Bromwich Albion	31	(0)
2006–2007	→ Manchester United (loan)	6	(0)
2007–2012	Manchester United	26	(0)
2012	→ Watford (loan)	13	(0)
2012–2014	Brighton & Hove Albion	84	(0)
2014–2015	Wolverhampton Wanderers	13	(0)
2015–2019	Birmingham City	89	(0)
Total		349	(0)

International career
1998	Poland U16	3	(0)
2000	Poland U18	3	(0)
2001–2003	Poland U21	14	(0)
2003–2012	Poland	11	(0)

Managerial career
- 2023–2024: Poland (goalkeeping coach)
Medal record
Men's football
Representing Poland
UEFA European Under-18 Championship
Winner	2001 Finland
- * Club domestic league appearances and goals

Tomasz Mirosław Kuszczak (Polish pronunciation: [ˈtɔmaʂ ˈkuʂt͡ʂak]; born 20 March 1982) is a Polish former professional footballer who played as a goalkeeper. He was most recently the goalkeeping coach of the Poland national team.

Born in Krosno Odrzańskie, Kuszczak previously played for Śląsk Wrocław in Poland, as well as for the German clubs KFC Uerdingen 05 and Hertha BSC, before moving in 2004 to England with West Bromwich Albion. During the summer of 2006 he transferred to Manchester United, where as backup goalkeeper to Edwin van der Sar he won three Premier League titles, two Football League Cups, three FA Community Shields, the FIFA Club World Cup and the UEFA Champions League. In 2012 Kuszczak joined Brighton & Hove Albion, who released him at the end of the 2013–14 season. After spending the latter part of the 2014–15 season with Wolverhampton Wanderers, he signed for Birmingham City in July 2015, playing for the club until his retirement in 2019.

Kuszczak made 14 appearances for the Poland under-21 side and was capped 11 times at senior level. He was a member of the nation's squad at the 2006 FIFA World Cup.

== Club career ==
=== Hertha BSC ===
Kuszczak was born in Krosno Odrzańskie, Poland. He joined German club Hertha BSC in 2000, spending a year with their reserve team before being promoted to the first team in 2001. He subsequently spent three seasons as the third-choice goalkeeper at the club, behind Gábor Király and Christian Fiedler, and failed to make a single appearance in the Bundesliga. He was out of contract with Hertha when he was signed by West Bromwich Albion manager Gary Megson on 14 July 2004.

=== West Bromwich Albion ===
He made his debut for West Brom on 18 September 2004 in a Premier League match against Fulham at The Hawthorns, which ended in a 1–1 draw. He then played in a League Cup match against Colchester United on 21 September 2004, Albion losing 2–1.

Kuszczak had only kept goal in one match in the Premier League before West Brom's game against Manchester United on the penultimate match day of the 2004–05 season, with the Baggies facing a tough relegation battle. He put in a striking performance, having to step in front of the goal after the first choice keeper Russell Hoult was injured in the first half. West Bromwich drew the match 1–1, with Kuszczak remaining unbeaten during his 68 minutes on the pitch. This performance helped Kuszczak earn his first man of the match award in the Premier League. The following week, in the season's last match against Portsmouth, Kuszczak had another impressive game, enabling West Bromwich to win 2–0, and hence stay up in the league.

In 2005–06, Kuszczak was supposed to be the reserve keeper behind Chris Kirkland. With Kirkland injured, Kuszczak kept goal in his first Premier League match of the season on 30 October 2005, but could not prevent Newcastle United from winning 3–0. His performances then improved, allowing him to become the first-choice keeper. This continued despite Kirkland's return from injury. On 15 January 2006, Kuszczak had an impressive game against Wigan Athletic, making a match-winning save late on from Jason Roberts, with West Bromwich winning the game 1–0. The save was voted "Save of the Season" by viewers of BBC TV's Match of the Day programme. Nonetheless, his club were relegated at the end of the season.

=== Manchester United ===
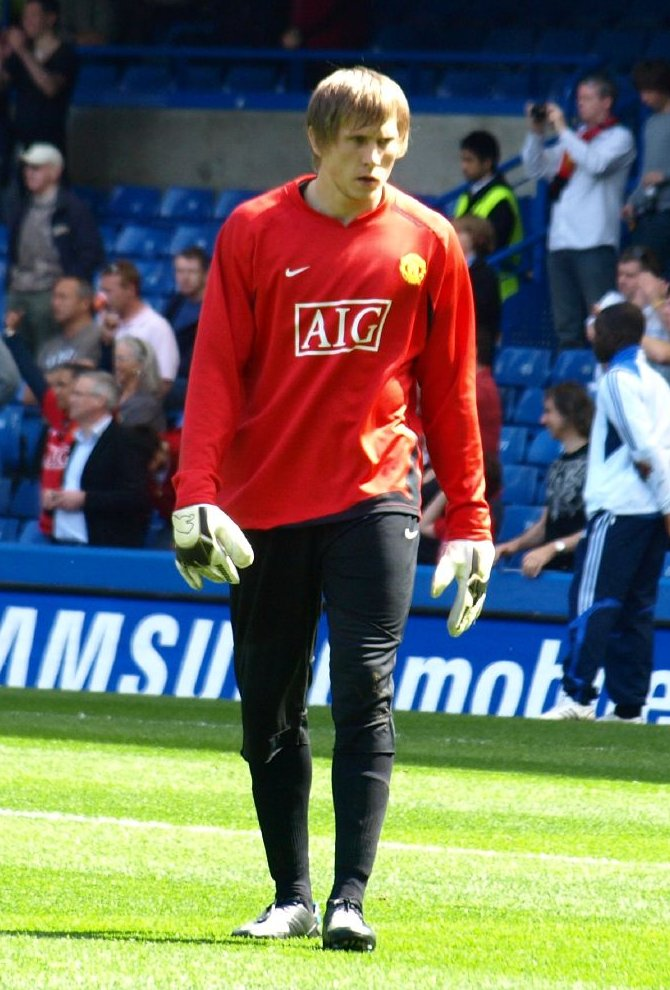
Kuszczak training at Manchester United

On 7 July 2006, it was confirmed by West Bromwich Albion manager Bryan Robson that Manchester United had made a bid of around £2 million for Kuszczak. On 3 August, West Brom rejected a £2.5 million bid for Kuszczak from United, citing that a one-year loan spell for United starlet Giuseppe Rossi would also have to be included along with the cash to result in a deal. On 10 August 2006, Kuszczak joined Manchester United in a deal involving the transfers of England Under-18 goalkeeper Luke Steele and defender Paul McShane to West Brom. When officially announcing the move, United failed to state the terms of the deal, leading to suggestions that it was a merely a loan deal. Chief executive David Gill clarified the situation, stating, "Tomasz will be a Manchester United player for the next four years, he has come to us on loan for the first year, and then will join us permanently in July 2007."

Kuszczak made his debut against Arsenal on 17 September 2006, he conceded an early penalty but did redeem himself by saving the ensuing spot-kick from Gilberto Silva. Despite saving the penalty, Arsenal's Emmanuel Adebayor scored a late goal which gave them a 1–0 win at Old Trafford, which was the club's first defeat of the season. His first start came in a 2–1 away win over Crewe Alexandra in the League Cup on 25 October. He had his name misspelled on the back of his shirt during this game, with it incorrectly reading "Zuszczak". Although Kuszczak did not play enough Premier League games in the 2006–07 season, he received a winners medal by special application to the Premier League.

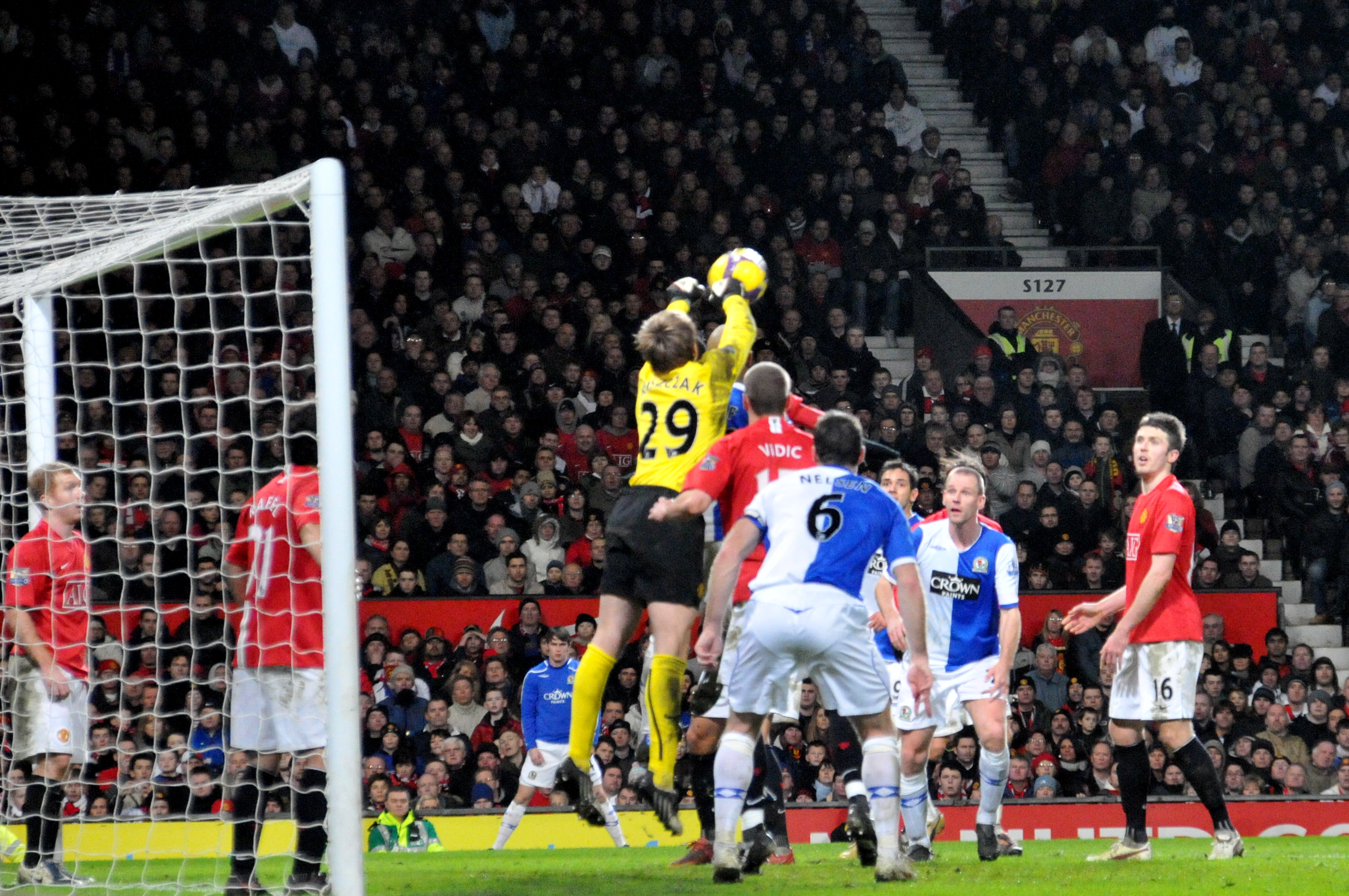
Kuszczak punching the ball away in a 2–1 home win over Blackburn Rovers on 21 February 2009

On 2 July 2007, Manchester United announced that the permanent transfer had been completed, for a fee of £2.125 million. Due to Dutch keeper Edwin van der Sar's continued good form and Ben Foster's knee injury, Kuszczak was named Manchester United's number 2 for the 2007–08 season. During an interview in May 2007 Kuszczak stated that he wanted one day to become the number 1 at Manchester United.

On 8 March 2008, in an FA Cup tie against Portsmouth, Kuszczak replaced the injured Van der Sar at half-time, only to receive a straight red card for a foul on Milan Baroš 30 minutes later. Rio Ferdinand was forced to take over in goal, but failed to save Sulley Muntari's penalty, resulting in United being knocked out of the competition.

In September 2008, Kuszczak signed a two-year extension which would keep him at Old Trafford until 2012. However, after being overlooked in favour of Foster for the 2009 League Cup Final, Kuszczak faced problems in aiming to become United's new first choice after Van der Sar's retirement and expressed discontent with his situation at Manchester United. In 2009, he was said to be considering his long-term future at the club. Kuszczak kept a clean sheet in his first game of the 2009–10 season, a 1–0 home win over Wolverhampton Wanderers in the third round of the League Cup. After Van der Sar suffered an injury, Kuszczak returned to the side for a match against Portsmouth on 28 November. He retained his position in the starting line-up for United's League Cup fifth round match against Tottenham Hotspur, the next league game against West Ham United and the last game of the Champions League group stage against Wolfsburg. Kuszczak kept another clean sheet in United's final game of the decade as they beat Wigan Athletic 5–0 at Old Trafford. However, Van der Sar's return to the team in January 2010 saw him lose his place in the side. He started, however, in the 2010 Football League Cup Final against Aston Villa, which saw him fail to save a penalty in the first minutes of the game, although United went on to win the trophy, after a 2–1 victory.

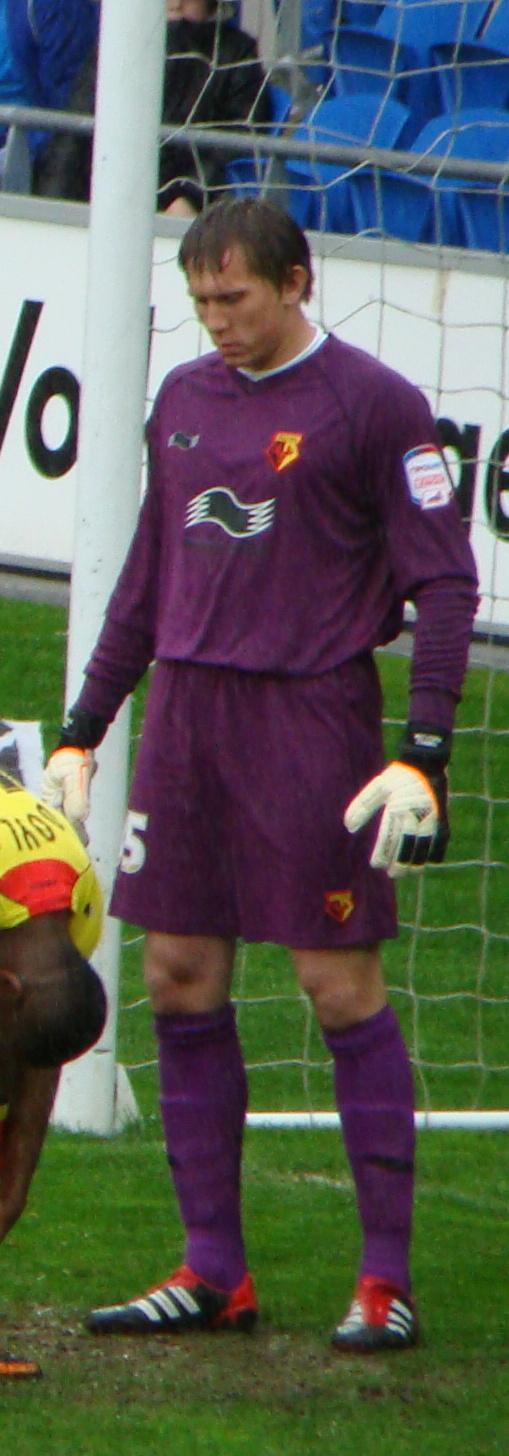
Kuszczak in 2012 with Watford

Kuszczak revealed Alex Ferguson blocked his move to Leeds United on loan. On 3 February 2012, Ferguson confirmed that Kuszczak would be out of contract in the summer and that he would not be signing a new contract with the club. On 21 February, Kuszczak moved on an emergency loan to join Championship side Watford until the end of the season. He stated afterwards that he had joined Watford because he missed being involved on a matchday and wanted to have a chance of being involved in the Euro's in his home country this summer. He started 13 games during his loan spell, missing just one game which was against Middlesbrough on 28 April due to his wife giving birth.

On 1 June 2012 Kuszczak's release from Manchester United was confirmed on the club's website. After leaving Manchester United, Kuszczak made the accusation that Ferguson held his career back – specifically that he was prevented from joining other clubs by inflating his asking price.

=== Brighton & Hove Albion ===
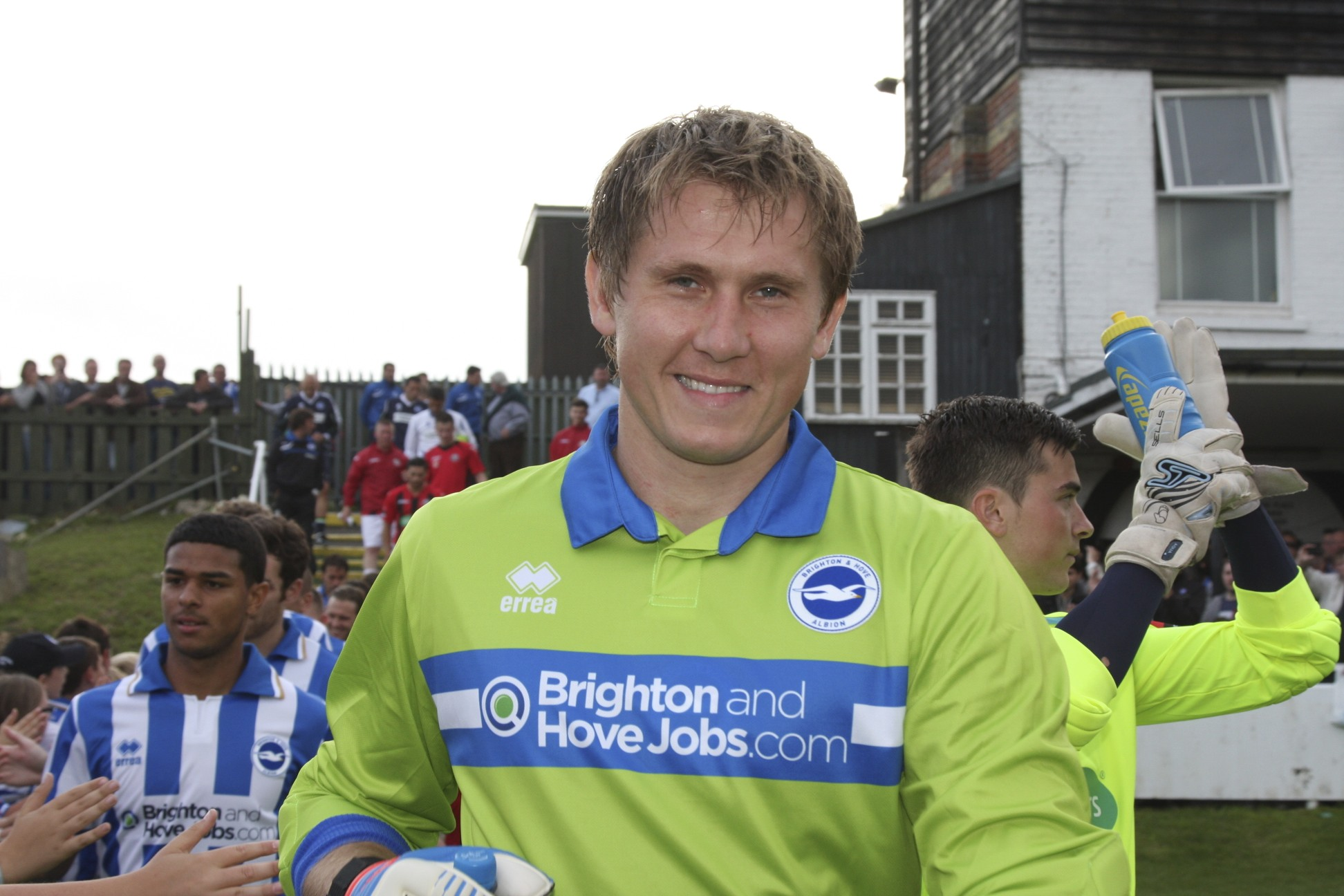
Kuszczak with Brighton & Hove Albion in 2012

On 19 June 2012, Kuszczak joined Brighton & Hove Albion, signing a two-year contract. He revealed that he turned down numerous other clubs to sign for the Seagulls and stated "I spent eight years in the Premier League and that is where I want to be again. I believe I can get there with Brighton because this club is heading in only one direction, and I want to play my part in helping us get there." Kuszczak made a huge impact at the club, earning the Albion player of the month award in early 2013 after several match saving performances. Kuszczak made 84 appearances for Brighton & Hove Albion before being released at the end of the 2013–14 season.

=== Wolverhampton Wanderers ===
On 3 November 2014, after a trial with the Championship club, Kuszczak signed a short-term contract with Wolverhampton Wanderers to last until January 2015. This arrangement was then extended until the end of the 2014–15 season. Following an injury to Carl Ikeme, Kuszczak made his Championship debut for Wolves against Reading on 7 February 2015, conceding a goal after 20 seconds.

=== Birmingham City ===
On 1 July 2015, Kuszczak signed a two-year contract with another Championship club, Birmingham City. In the eighth minute of stoppage time in the opening match of the season, at home to Reading, Kuszczak saved Orlando Sá's penalty to preserve Birmingham's 2–1 lead. He continued as first-choice goalkeeper throughout the season, and began 2016–17 in post, but was injured in the warm-up before Birmingham's match at Reading on 13 September. His replacement, Adam Legzdins, kept a clean sheet, and kept his place for the next seven matches, even after Kuszczak's return to fitness. Manager Gary Rowett brought Kuszczak back into the side for the local derby against Aston Villa, and he retained the starting spot for the rest of the season as the team narrowly avoided relegation.

He signed a contract for another two years, but new manager Harry Redknapp's first signing was goalkeeper David Stockdale, whom he installed in the starting eleven. After a "solid display" against Derby County in September as replacement for the injured Stockdale, Kuszczak expressed his disappointment at having been "dropped without any chance to get back". He kept his place for two months, despite a groin problem, until Stockdale regained fitness. Kuszczak was given time to recover from the injury, but even then, untried youngster Connal Trueman remained on the bench. During the January 2018 transfer window, there was reported interest from Newcastle United and Derby County, but Redknapp's successor, Steve Cotterill, insisted that he would only leave on Birmingham's terms. When Garry Monk replaced Cotterill in March, Kuszczak returned to the bench, but did not play again, and at the end of the season the Polish press reported that he had been told he could leave. Neither he nor Stockdale were involved with the first-team squad in 2018–19, and Birmingham confirmed in May 2019 that he would leave the club at the end of his contract.

== International career ==
Kuszczak's international debut came on 11 December 2003 against Malta. Poland won the away game 4–0.

Due to his impressive performances for West Bromwich Albion, he was called up to the 23-man Poland national football team for the 2006 FIFA World Cup. However, in a World Cup warm-up match between Poland and Colombia on 30 May 2006, he conceded a goal directly from a long punt by the opposition goalkeeper, Neco Martínez. Kuszczak subsequently ended up as Artur Boruc's back-up during the tournament and did not play.

Kuszczak was named in Poland's squad for UEFA Euro 2008, but was forced to drop out after picking up a back injury and was replaced by Wojciech Kowalewski. A lack of club football at Manchester United had also seen him slide down the pecking order for his country of late, but he was recalled to the squad for the friendly matches against Romania and Canada by new coach Franciszek Smuda, playing in both matches with mixed results.

Kuszczak was called up for the 2014 World Cup qualifiers against Montenegro and Moldova in September 2013, filling in for injured first choice goalkeeper, Wojciech Szczęsny, but remained an unused substitute. Kuszczak was again called up by Fornalik in October, for the friendly game at home to South Africa and the World Cup qualifier against England. He was tipped to start against South Africa but Fornalik opted for Przemysław Tytoń after becoming out of the fold at PSV Eindhoven. This game ended as a 1–0 win for the Poles, he was then an unused substitute in the England game. On the 14th of November, Kuszczak came on at half-time in the international friendly against Uruguay.

== Post-playing career ==
Following retirement, Kuszczak moved back to Poland, where he launched a construction company and graduated from college with a degree in sports journalism.

On 20 September 2023, he joined Michał Probierz's staff at the Poland national team as a goalkeeping coach. On 18 March 2024, it was announced Kuszczak was no longer involved with the national team.

== Career statistics ==
=== Club ===
Appearances and goals by club, season and competition
Club	Season	League			National cup (Note: Includes FA Cup)		League cup (Note: Includes League Cup)		Europe		Other		Total	
Club	Season	Division	Apps	Goals	Apps	Goals	Apps	Goals	Apps	Goals	Apps	Goals	Apps	Goals
Hertha BSC	2001–02	Bundesliga	0	0	0	0	—		—		—		0	0
Hertha BSC	2002–03	Bundesliga	0	0	0	0	—		—		—		0	0
Hertha BSC	2003–04	Bundesliga	0	0	0	0	—		—		—		0	0
Hertha BSC	Total		0	0	0	0	—		—		—		0	0
West Bromwich Albion	2004–05	Premier League	3	0	1	0	1	0	—		—		5	0
West Bromwich Albion	2005–06	Premier League	28	0	0	0	2	0	—		—		30	0
West Bromwich Albion	2006–07	Championship	0	0	0	0	0	0	—		—		0	0
West Bromwich Albion	Total		31	0	1	0	3	0	—		—		35	0
Manchester United (loan)	2006–07	Premier League	6	0	5	0	2	0	0	0	—		13	0
Manchester United	2007–08	Premier League	9	0	1	0	1	0	5 (Note: Appearances in UEFA Champions League)	0	0	0	16	0
Manchester United	2008–09	Premier League	4	0	0	0	2	0	2	0	0	0	8	0
Manchester United	2009–10	Premier League	8	0	1	0	3	0	2	0	0	0	14	0
Manchester United	2010–11	Premier League	5	0	1	0	2	0	2	0	0	0	10	0
Manchester United	2011–12	Premier League	0	0	0	0	0	0	0	0	0	0	0	0
Manchester United	Total		32	0	8	0	10	0	11	0	0	0	61	0
Watford (loan)	2011–12	Championship	13	0	—		—		—		—		13	0
Brighton & Hove Albion	2012–13	Championship	43	0	0	0	1	0	—		2 (Note: Appearances in Football League play-offs)	0	46	0
Brighton & Hove Albion	2013–14	Championship	41	0	0	0	0	0	—		2	0	43	0
Brighton & Hove Albion	Total		84	0	0	0	1	0	—		4	0	89	0
Wolverhampton Wanderers	2014–15	Championship	13	0	0	0	—		—		—		13	0
Birmingham City	2015–16	Championship	41	0	0	0	1	0	—		—		42	0
Birmingham City	2016–17	Championship	38	0	0	0	0	0	—		—		38	0
Birmingham City	2017–18	Championship	10	0	0	0	2	0	—		—		12	0
Birmingham City	2018–19	Championship	0	0	0	0	0	0	—		—		0	0
Birmingham City	Total		89	0	0	0	3	0	—		—		92	0
Career total			261	0	9	0	17	0	11	0	4	0	302	0

=== International ===
Appearances and goals by national team and year
National team	Year	Apps	Goals
Poland	2003	2	0
Poland	2004	0	0
Poland	2005	0	0
Poland	2006	2	0
Poland	2007	1	0
Poland	2008	1	0
Poland	2009	2	0
Poland	2010	2	0
Poland	2011	0	0
Poland	2012	1	0
Total		11	0

== Honours ==
Manchester United

- Premier League: 2006–07, 2007–08, 2010–11
- Football League Cup: 2008–09, 2009–10
- FA Community Shield: 2007, 2008, 2010
- UEFA Champions League: 2007–08
- FIFA Club World Cup: 2008

Poland U18

- UEFA European Under-18 Championship: 2001
