= Diomansy Kamara =

Senegalese footballer (born 1980)

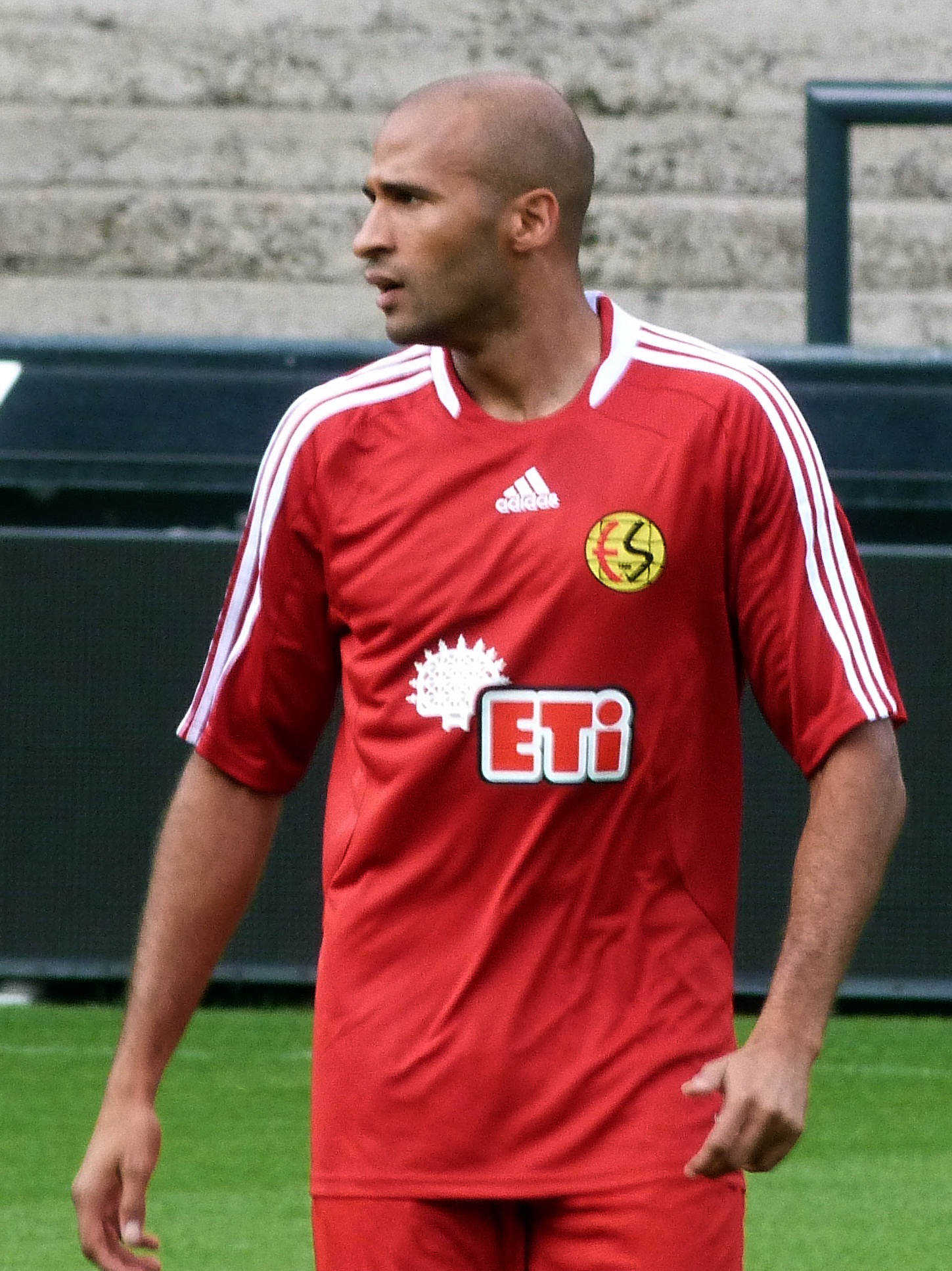
- Kamara with Eskişehirspor in 2011

Personal information
- Full name: Diomansy Mehdi Moustapha Kamara
- Date of birth: 8 November 1980 (age 46)
- Place of birth: Paris, France
- Height: 1.84 m (6 ft 0 in)
- Position: Striker

Senior career*
Years	Team	Apps	(Gls)
1998–1999	Red Star	4	(0)
1999–2001	Catanzaro	34	(9)
2001–2005	Modena	82	(15)
2004–2005	Portsmouth	25	(4)
2005–2007	West Bromwich Albion	60	(21)
2007–2011	Fulham	59	(12)
2010	→ Celtic (loan)	9	(2)
2011	→ Leicester City (loan)	7	(2)
2011–2014	Eskişehirspor	91	(26)
2014–2015	Catanzaro	12	(4)
2015	NorthEast United	12	(3)
Total		395	(98)

International career
2003–2011	Senegal	50	(9)
- * Club domestic league appearances and goals

Diomansy Mehdi Moustapha Kamara (born 8 November 1980) is a former professional footballer who played as a striker. Born in Paris, France, he played internationally for Senegal, whom he represented at three Africa Cup of Nations.

During a 17-year professional career, Kamara played for football clubs in Italy, England, Scotland, Turkey and India as well as France.

== Club career ==
=== Early career ===
Born in Paris, Kamara grew up in Gennevilliers. He began his professional career with Red Star 93 before joining Catanzaro during the 1999–2000 season.

He made 34 league appearances and scored nine times for the Calabrian club before signing for Modena. In three seasons there, he scored 15 times in 82 appearances, impressing many with his speed and agility.

=== Portsmouth ===
In August 2004, Portsmouth wanted to sign Kamara for a loan deal but eventually signed him for £2.5 million for a permanent transfer, making him their then record signing. However, despite a bright start, Kamara struggled for form and injuries during the 2004–05 season, and after just one year at Portsmouth they took advantage of a clause in his contract which allowed them to move him on to West Bromwich Albion whilst only paying £1 million of his initial transfer fee to Modena. Albion paid £1.5 million for Kamara.

=== West Bromwich Albion ===
Kamara made his Albion debut on 13 August 2005, replacing Kanu in the 60th minute in a 0–0 draw away at Manchester City. He picked up a yellow card in each of his first three games for the club. His first goal for West Brom was scored in a 4–1 Hawthorns win over Bradford City in the League Cup, on 20 September 2005. It was one of only two goals scored by Kamara during 2005–06; his first league goal for the club was scored against Manchester City on 10 December 2005, Albion winning 2–0. Albion were relegated from the Premier League that season, but 2006–07 saw Kamara hit a rich vein of form, netting 23 goals in all competitions and helping Albion reach the playoff final. His goalscoring exploits earned him the Championship Player-of-the-Month award for October 2006, as well as the PFA Fans' Player-of-the-Month award for February 2007. He was also named in the PFA Championship Team of the Year and won the West Bromwich Albion Player of the Year award.

=== Fulham ===
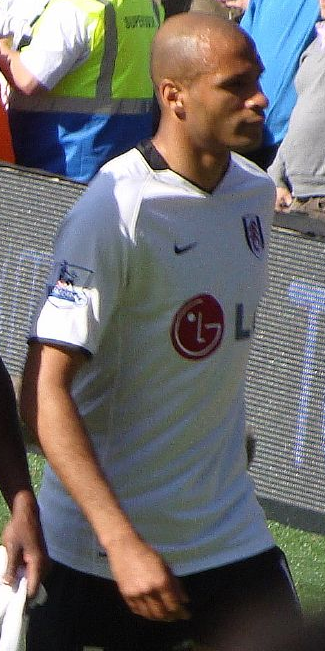
Diomansy Kamara in action for Fulham.

On 9 July 2007, Kamara signed a four-year deal with Fulham for £6 million and the move was a club record sale from West Brom. Following his move to Fulham, he vowed that he could score 'a lot of goals' in the Premier League with Fulham. He made his debut for the Cottagers in a 2–1 defeat away at Arsenal on 12 August 2007, replacing fellow debutant David Healy in the second half. Kamara scored his first goal for Fulham in a 1–0 win at Shrewsbury Town in the League Cup, on 28 August 2007. Four days later, he notched his first league goal for the Cottagers, a superb late overhead kick to earn a 3–3 draw with Tottenham Hotspur. After the match, Kamara told the club's official website that the overhead kick goal was "classed the goal as possibly the best of his career". On 25 November 2007, he scored his second goal, in a match against Blackburn Rovers which ended in a 2–2 draw. On 29 March 2008, he scored his third goal, against Derby County in another 2–2 draw, which resulted Derby County being relegated to the Football League. Later in the 2007–08 season, after having a relatively dry spell in front of goal, Kamara resurrected Fulham's Premier League survival hopes with two goals in the last twenty minutes (plus a Danny Murphy rebound from a penalty saved by Joe Hart) secured a rare away win against Manchester City. Fulham eventually survived relegation, in the last game. Whilst playing for Senegal in a match against Liberia in June 2008, he ruptured his cruciate ligament, an injury which required reconstructive surgery.

In his first start for the Cottagers since his injury Kamara scored a brace against Aston Villa and also made an assist to Danny Murphy to score, helping his side win 3–1 on 9 May 2009. After the brace, manager Roy Hodgson praised Kamara's good performance. Kamara also scored in the following match, netting the winning goal in a 1–0 over Newcastle United on 16 May 2009.

After the 2008–09 season, Kamara was linked with a move to join French Champion Bordeaux who wanted him to replace the departing Marouane Chamakh who joined Arsenal, with Roma keen to sign him as well. However, the move was rejected as Kamara was not interested in a move overseas but instead hoping to find a new club in the UK.

In the Premier League 2008–09 and 2009–10 seasons, Kamara began playing less in the Premier League. He scored his only league goal in the 2009–10 season for Fulham in a 2–0 victory over Hull City on 19 September 2009. On 17 September, he helped Fulham secure an away draw against CSKA Sofia which ended 1–1 in the Europa League. On 5 November 2009, Kamara scored from a penalty after being fouled in the penalty box in a match against Italian side Roma; he was substituted off in the 46th minute for Erik Nevland and Fulham went on lose with a two-goals comeback from Roma. On 1 December 2009, he suffered knee problem which kept him out for one month. He made his return for Fulham in a 2–0 loss against Tottenham Hotspur on 26 January 2010 after coming on for Zoltán Gera in the 72 minute.

==== Loan to Celtic ====
On 1 February 2010, Kamara moved to Celtic on loan until the end of the 2009–10 season, and Celtic had an option to make the deal permanent if he impressed during his loan stint. His move to Celtic was allowed after Fulham brought Stefano Okaka on loan from Roma. Kamara had previously played under then-Celtic manager Tony Mowbray at West Bromwich Albion. He made his debut on 2 February 2010 against Kilmarnock at Rugby Park in a 1–0 defeat.

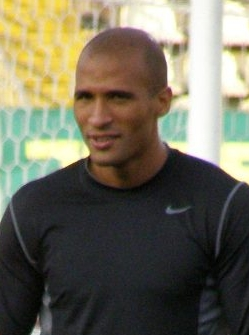
Kamara training for Fulham in 2009

On 7 February, Kamara scored his first goal for Celtic against Dunfermline in the Scottish Cup with a strike from the edge of the box; it was also the game that provided the first Celtic goal for his strike partner Robbie Keane. On 13 February, he scored his second goal for Celtic and his first SPL goal, against Aberdeen in a 4–4 draw at Pittodrie. He also provided the assist for a goal from Keane who had assisted Kamara's goal. On 20 February 2010, Kamara provided an assist for Keane who scored a winning goal against Dundee United in a 1–0 win. He then suffered an injury that kept him out about one month and made his return on 13 April 2010 against Motherwell in a 2–0 win. On 25 April, he scored the first of two goals in a 2–0 win against Dundee United after returning from injury.

As his loan spell was set to expire, Kamara revealed he wanted to stay at Celtic permanently and that he would happily stay on at the club under interim boss Neil Lennon after the sacking of Tony Mowbray. He revealed that he set his sights on securing a permanent deal at the club and described it as his 'priority' to stay at Celtic. However the move never happened, as Celtic decided not to pay the £2.5 million buyout clause in his contract. Kamara returned to Fulham and set his sights on a move to his boyhood club PSG.

==== Return to Fulham ====
Upon his return to Fulham, Kamara stated that the newly appointed manager of Fulham, Mark Hughes, had made him stay and that he had been given a fresh chance. He also said that he would have left Fulham if Roy Hodgson had stayed in charge of the club (he became manager of Liverpool instead). Kamara did get more playing time for Fulham as the club was short of options following injuries to Bobby Zamora and Mousa Dembélé. He scored his first league goal of the 2010–11 season on 16 October 2010 against Tottenham Hotspur, in a 2–1 defeat in the 30th minute at Craven Cottage. He also scored in a 2–1 defeat against Arsenal on 4 December 2010 at the Emirates Stadium in the 30th minute, playing 73 minutes of the match before being replaced by fellow striker Andrew Johnson. Despite the loss, manager Mark Hughes praised Kamara's performance, whilst Kamara stated that he was keen to hold down a regular first team place. On 8 January 2011, Kamara netted a hat-trick and played the full 90 minutes in the third round of the FA Cup against Peterborough United in a 6–2 victory at Craven Cottage. However, after the return of Zamora and Dembélé from injury, further opportunities were limited.

==== Loan to Leicester City ====
Leicester City signed Kamara on loan until the end of the 2010–11 season on 21 March 2011 after Leicester City manager Sven-Göran Eriksson confirmed his interest in signing him. Kamara made his competitive debut against Middlesbrough on 2 April 2011, making an assist in a 3–3 draw. He scored his first goal in a 4–0 win over Burnley on 9 April. He scored his second goal against Ipswich making the score 4–2. It was the last league goal to be scored at the Walkers Stadium before it was renamed to King Power Stadium in summer 2011. After his loan spell finished, Kamara admitted his contribution was disappointing at Leicester City but was open to a return.

=== Eskişehirspor ===
On 24 June 2011, Fulham announced that Kamara would not be renewing his contract and had left the club to sign with Süper Lig club Eskisehirspor. On 10 September 2011, Kamara made his debut in the Eskişehirspor shirt against Beşiktaş in a 2–1 win. The following week, he scored his first goal for Eskişehirspor in a 4–0 win over Sivasspor on 18 September 2011. Kamara continued his goalscoring form and became the top scorer for the club in his first season with 10 goals and the second top assist provider with 5 behind defender Dedê with 10.

=== NorthEast United ===
On 7 July 2015, he signed for Indian Super League club NorthEast United FC.

== International career ==
Kamara played 50 games and scored nine goals for the Senegal national team.

== Career statistics ==
=== Club ===
Appearances and goals by club, season and competition
Club	Season	League			National cup (Note: Includes Coppa Italia, FA Cup, Scottish Cup, Turkish Cup)		League cup (Note: Includes Football League Cup)		Continental		Other		Total	
Club	Season	Division	Apps	Goals	Apps	Goals	Apps	Goals	Apps	Goals	Apps	Goals	Apps	Goals
Red Star	1998–99	Division 2	4	0					–		–		4	0
Catanzaro	1999–2000	Serie C2	11	4			–		–		–		11	4
Catanzaro	2000–01	Serie C2	23	5			–		–		2 (Note: Appearances in Serie C2 relegation play-offs)	0	25	5
Catanzaro	Total		34	9			–		–		2	0	36	9
Modena	2001–02	Serie B	24	4	0	0	–		–		–		24	4
Modena	2002–03	Serie A	29	5	2	1	–		–		–		31	6
Modena	2003–04	Serie A	29	6	2	0	–		–		–		31	6
Modena	2004–05	Serie A	–		2	0	–		–		–		2	0
Modena	Total		82	15	6	1	–		–		–		88	16
Portsmouth	2004–05	Premier League	25	4	2	0	2	2	–		–		29	6
West Bromwich Albion	2005–06	Premier League	26	1	0	0	3	1	–		–		29	2
West Bromwich Albion	2006–07	Championship	34	20	4	2	2	0	–		3 (Note: Appearances in Championship play-offs)	1	43	23
West Bromwich Albion	Total		60	21	4	2	5	1	–		3	1	72	25
Fulham	2007–08	Premier League	28	5	0	0	2	1	–		–		30	6
Fulham	2008–09	Premier League	12	4	2	0	0	0	–		–		14	4
Fulham	2009–10	Premier League	9	1	0	0	0	0	4 (Note: Appearances in UEFA Europa League)	2	–		13	3
Fulham	2010–11	Premier League	10	2	1	3	0	0	–		–		11	5
Fulham	Total		59	12	3	3	2	1	4	2	–		68	18
Celtic (loan)	2009–10	Scottish Premier League	9	2	1	1	0	0	0	0	–		10	3
Leicester City (loan)	2010–11	Championship	7	2	0	0	0	0	–		–		7	2
Eskişehirspor	2011–12	Süper Lig	31	13	3	1	–		–		4 (Note: Appearances in Süper Lig play-offs)	2	38	16
Eskişehirspor	2012–13	Süper Lig	30	11	6	0	–		4	0	–		40	11
Eskişehirspor	2013–14	Süper Lig	30	2	11	2	–		–		–		41	4
Eskişehirspor	Total		91	26	20	3	–		4	0	4	2	119	31
Catanzaro	2014–15	Serie C	12	4	1	0	–		–		–		13	4
NorthEast United	2015	Indian Super League	12	3	–		–		–		–		12	3
Career total			395	98	37	10	9	4	8	2	9	3	458	117

=== International ===
Appearances and goals by national team and year
National team	Year	Apps	Goals
Senegal	2003	6	0
Senegal	2004	10	2
Senegal	2005	3	1
Senegal	2006	8	1
Senegal	2007	8	3
Senegal	2008	9	3
Senegal	2009	0	0
Senegal	2010	2	0
Senegal	2011	4	0
Total		50	10

== Honours ==
Individual

- PFA Team of the Year: 2006–07 Football League Championship
