= Stuart Nicholson (footballer) =

English footballer

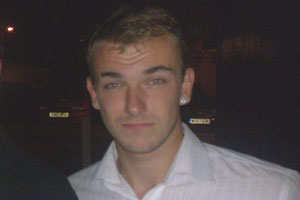

Personal information
- Full name: Stuart Ian Nicholson
- Date of birth: 3 February 1987 (age 39)
- Place of birth: Newcastle upon Tyne, England
- Position: Striker

Youth career
- West Bromwich Albion

Senior career*
Years	Team	Apps	(Gls)
2005–2008	West Bromwich Albion	9	(4)
2006–2007	→Bristol Rovers (loan)	10	(4)
2007	→Bristol Rovers (loan)	12	(8)
2007	→Shrewsbury Town (loan)	14	(1)
2008	→Wrexham (loan)	13	(0)
2008–2009	Newcastle Blue Star	5	(5)
2009	Tamworth	7	(4)
2009	→AFC Telford United (loan)	1	(0)
2009–2010	West Allotment Celtic	5	(8)
2010	Sunshine George Cross	9	(6)
2010	Northcote City	8	(6)
2010	Birtley Town	7	(9)
2010–2011	Hebburn Town	7	(9)
2011	Bentleigh Greens	11	(3)
2011–2012	Moreland Zebras	19	(23)
2013	Jarrow Roofing B CA	20	(33)
2014	FC Clifton Hill	12	(17)
2014	St Albans Saints SC	2	(2)
2014	FC Clifton Hill		
2015	Preston Lions FC	9	(5)
2015	Westgate FC	5	(5)
2016–	Springvale City	23	(24)

International career^{‡}
2006	England U19	2	(1)
- * Club domestic league appearances and goals as of 15:56, 2 January 2011 (UTC) ‡ National team caps and goals as of 16:30, 12 December 2009 (UTC)

Stuart Ian Nicholson (born 3 February 1987) is a former professional footballer, currently living in Melbourne, Australia and last played for Springvale City FC.

Stuart was also a former England Under-19 international

== Career ==
=== West Bromwich Albion ===
Nicholson, made his debut for West Bromwich Albion on 17 January 2006, coming on as an extra-time substitute in a 3–2 FA Cup defeat away at Reading. He made his Premiership debut four days later in the 1–0 loss against Sunderland at The Hawthorns, when he replaced Nathan Ellington, whom he describes as his childhood hero. He won the West Bromwich Albion Young Player of the Year award for 2005–06 and earned the nickname "The Knife" for his sharpness in front of goal. Albion turned down a seven figure sum for Nicholson from rivals Aston Villa and offered him a new contract. He was given a place in the first team squad for the 2006–07 season, and marked his first start with a goal against Leyton Orient on 24 August in the first round of the League Cup.

=== Bristol Rovers ===
Nicholson joined Bristol Rovers on loan in November 2006. Unusually for someone born in the north-east of England, he has been a fan of the club since being given a Bristol Rovers shirt as a present when he was 14. The loan was due to last three months, but Nicholson was recalled four weeks early by West Brom as the striker scored in 3 successive games for the gas. before returning to Bristol Rovers for a second loan spell during the same season.

He scored a brace on 17 March 2007 against Notts County and followed it up with the winner against Stockport County on 20 March, both games at the Memorial Stadium. A stomach injury then kept him out of the team, and his loan spell was cut short in April when he returned to West Brom to have a hernia operation.

=== Shrewsbury Town ===
In August 2007 Nicholson joined Shrewsbury Town on a scheduled season-long loan. However, Nicholson did not see eye to eye with Gary Peters and by December he had found the net just once for the Shrews in 14 league appearances. On 18 December it was announced that he had returned to Albion due to an ongoing "personal problem", with his loan spell at Shrewsbury set to be officially ended in January

=== Wrexham ===
On 18 January 2008 Nicholson joined Wrexham on a three-month loan deal. The striker's only goal came against Bradford City at the Racecourse Ground. In April Albion confirmed that they would release the player in the summer when his existing contract expires.

=== Newcastle Blue Star ===
He signed with Newcastle Blue Star in August 2008.

On 7 November Nicholson joined AFC Bournemouth on a week's trial, Bournemouth could not meet the asking price having been made available for transfer by Newcastle Blue Star after making five substitute appearances scoring in all up to that point in the 2008–09 season. After having been released by Blue Star midway through the 2008–09 season, Nicholson trained with Blyth Spartans

=== Tamworth ===
Nicholson's next move was a return to the midlands to team up with Conference North side Tamworth in January, 2009. He made his debut for Tamworth on 27 January 2009 against King's Lynn in a home Conference North fixture where he scored after 7 seconds in the year that Tamworth won promotion to the Conference National. Stuart was given the number 9 shirt and after 2 months he handed in a transfer request due to the fact Mills wanted to play him as a lone striker and at Nicholsons stature and to the dislike of Gary Mills he was put on gardening leave.

=== Preston Lions FC ===
Preston Lions FC has signed former West Bromwich Albion striker Stuart Nicholson for the 2015 Victorian State League 1 NW season. Stuart comes across from Moreland Zebras where he spent two years and it is the first new summer signing for coach Andy O'Dell, who says the addition of the pacey striker as 'an excellent opportunity both for player and club'.

== Honours ==
Bristol Rovers

- Football League Trophy runner-up: 2006–07
