= Nathan Ellington =

English footballer (born 1981)

Personal information
- Full name: Nathan Levi Fontaine Ellington
- Date of birth: 2 July 1981 (age 45)
- Place of birth: Bradford, England
- Height: 5 ft 10 in (1.78 m)
- Position: Striker

Team information
- Current team: Egerton (player-assistant manager)

Youth career
- Tooting & Mitcham United

Senior career*
Years	Team	Apps	(Gls)
1998–1999	Walton & Hersham	20	(9)
1999–2002	Bristol Rovers	116	(35)
2002–2005	Wigan Athletic	134	(59)
2005–2007	West Bromwich Albion	68	(15)
2007–2011	Watford	51	(5)
2008–2009	→ Derby County (loan)	27	(3)
2010	→ Skoda Xanthi (loan)	19	(6)
2011	→ Preston North End (loan)	18	(2)
2011–2013	Ipswich Town	17	(0)
2012–2013	→ Scunthorpe United (loan)	6	(0)
2013	Crewe Alexandra	8	(0)
2013	Southport	3	(0)
2017–2018	Egerton	3	(1)
Total		490	(135)

Managerial career
- 2018–: Egerton (assistant manager)
- * Club domestic league appearances and goals

Nathan Levi Fontaine Ellington (born 2 July 1981) is an English retired professional footballer who played as a striker.

Ellington started his playing career with non-League side Tooting & Mitcham United. Having played once for the club, he switched to Walton & Hersham in 1997, and remained there for two years, before signing for Bristol Rovers in February 1999. He played for Bristol Rovers in 116 league games, before switching to Wigan Athletic in March 2002. He made 134 league appearances for Wigan before joining Premier League side West Bromwich Albion in 2005. Although he made 68 league appearances for the club, he struggled to settle in the area, and moved to Watford in 2007. During his time at Watford, he spent three loan spells away from the club; at Derby County during the 2008–2009 season, Skoda Xanthi in 2010, and Preston North End in 2011. Having made 55 league appearances for Watford, he switched to Ipswich Town in June 2011, but once again struggled to break into the first team, and spent the start of the 2012–13 season on loan to Scunthorpe United. Having cancelled his Ipswich contract by mutual consent, he joined Crewe Alexandra in March 2013, and made eight league appearances. He was released in July 2013 after his contract expired. He signed for Southport in October 2013, but was released two months later. In November 2017 he signed for Cheshire Football League side Egerton, and in July 2018 was appointed assistant manager.

== Career ==
=== Non-league and Bristol Rovers ===
Born in Bradford, West Yorkshire, Ellington began his career with non-League Tooting & Mitcham United, making one first team appearance at 16 years of age. He played regularly for the youth team there, but was frustrated by a lack of first team chances, so he moved to Walton & Hersham, before moving to Bristol Rovers in February 1999 for £150,000. He made his professional debut on 23 February 1999, coming on as a second-half substitute for Jamie Cureton in a 1–0 home defeat to Gillingham. He came off the bench to score his first goal on 6 March 1999, helping his team to a 2–0 win over York City. He found a growing reputation with the side, and his highest point for Rovers was scoring a hat-trick in a 3–1 win against Premier League side Derby County in the FA Cup, on 6 January 2002. This was the first time a team from the Third Division had beaten a Premier League team in the FA Cup. It was also the second of three hat-tricks scored by Ellington for Rovers, with all three coming within the space of a month. He was named in the PFA Division Three team of the year for 2001–02.

=== Wigan Athletic ===
On 28 March 2002—transfer deadline day—Ellington signed for Paul Jewell's Wigan Athletic for a then club record fee of £1.2 million. He made an instant impact, scoring on his debut in a 2–1 win at Chesterfield on 6 April 2002. He also scored on his home debut a week later as Wigan beat Northampton Town 3–0. His only hat-trick for Wigan came against West Bromwich Albion in a 3–1 League Cup victory on 2 October 2002, his second career hat-trick against Premiership opposition. He notably scored the last ever goal in Wimbledon F.C.'s final game at Selhurst Park before their relocation to Milton Keynes, during Wigan's 2–4 victory in September 2003. He was named Division One player of the month for February 2004. Ellington was a major factor in the club's promotion to the Premiership in the 2004–05 season, the first time they had reached the top flight in their history. He was the leading scorer in the Football League Championship and formed a formidable partnership with Jason Roberts, with whom he had previously played at Bristol Rovers. Both players were named in the PFA Championship team of the season. Ellington became one of the more desirable properties in English football, and joined West Bromwich Albion on 16 August 2005 for £3,000,001. With the player unable to agree a new contract with Wigan, Albion used a clause in his existing contract that allowed him to leave for any fee over £3 million.

=== West Bromwich Albion ===
Ellington made his West Brom (and Premier League) debut in a 4–0 away defeat at Chelsea on 24 August 2005, replacing Jonathan Greening in the second half. He scored twice in a 4–1 League Cup win against Bradford City on 20 September 2005, his first goals for the club. He generally struggled in his first ever season in the Premier League, as his season was damaged by a series of niggling injuries and a shoulder problem, but he still managed to score eight goals. Ellington's first Premiership goals came in the 4–0 win against Everton; he scored a goal in either half by a penalty and a long range shot. He became quite unpopular with the West Brom fans towards the end of the same season because of his complaint of a "bruised toe", and his refusal to have painkilling injections to help him through such a minor complaint. He almost redeemed himself near the end of the season though, when he scored for Albion in the 1–1 draw with Birmingham and almost went on to score the winner as a substitute, hitting the woodwork. In June 2006, West Bromwich Albion rejected an undisclosed offer for Ellington from his former club Wigan Athletic, insisting that the player was "not for sale".

After failing to settle in the area, Ellington submitted a transfer request in the 2007 January transfer window, which was reluctantly accepted by West Bromwich Albion. However, Albion chairman Jeremy Peace qualified this by stating that "...no-one will leave unless it suits us." Ellington was also still seen as an important part of the squad by manager Tony Mowbray. Wigan Athletic again expressed an interest in re-signing the player, but failed to meet Albion's valuation. Ellington therefore remained at the Midlands club, returning to the first team at the start of February after a month out due to a stress-related illness. Ellington won West Brom's official goal of the season competition for 2006–07, for his dipping, swerving half volley against Cardiff City, scored in a 1–0 win on 20 February 2007. One week after that goal, he received the first red card of his career, for a dangerous tackle on Middlesbrough's Stuart Parnaby. Albion subsequently lost the 5th round FA Cup replay on penalties. Ellington featured regularly towards the end of the season, helping Albion reach the play-offs, but in the play-off games he was used only as a substitute. Albion lost 1–0 to Derby County in the final at Wembley.

Ellington's only goal for Albion in 2007–08 came in a 2–0 win away at Peterborough United in the League Cup on 28 August 2007. It proved to be his last game for the club, as he signed for Watford the following day. In all he scored 20 goals in 81 appearances for West Bromwich Albion.

=== Watford ===
On 29 August 2007, Ellington joined Watford on a four-year deal. Watford paid a then club record £3.25 million for the striker, a fee that could rise to £4.25 million depending on appearances. He made his Watford debut three days later, coming on as a second-half substitute in a 2–0 win over Ipswich Town, hitting the post a few minutes after entering the field. Ellington initially found it difficult to command a place in the Watford starting line-up due to the excellent form of Darius Henderson and Marlon King, and his first goal for Watford did not come until he scored in a 1–1 draw against Charlton Athletic on 19 January 2008, and went on to score a further 2 goals in 3 games, but then did not score again until 5 April against Coventry, his last of the season. Ellington made 34 league appearances, 18 of them starts, scoring 4 goals. On 21 December 2009, Ellington signed for Greek side Xanthi FC on loan for the rest of the year. Having played in Greece for the whole of 2010, he returned to Watford in January 2011, but is unlikely to feature in their games.

He trained with Preston North End in January 2011, scoring two goals in a reserve team fixture on 11 January 2011. He signed for Preston on 13 January 2011 on loan until the end of the 2010–11 season. He will then be out of contract.

==== Derby County (loan) ====
Derby County signed Ellington on 30 May 2008 on a season-long loan, with a view to him joining the Rams permanently on a free transfer at the end of the season, in a move that re-united the player with manager Paul Jewell. Ellington had a successful pre-season with the Rams, scoring three times in seven matches. He made his debut for the club against Doncaster Rovers on 9 August 2008 and scored his first three goals for the club with a hat-trick against Lincoln City in the Football League Cup on 12 August. He scored his first league goal for the club on 4 October, an eighty-fifth-minute winner in the 2–1 victory away to Norwich City. He scored twice in a week in November - the second in a 4–1 victory at Brighton and Hove Albion on 4 November and the second in a 2–1 win at home to Leeds United on 11 November.

Ellington scored a penalty in the ninety-third minute against Stoke City in the quarter-finals of the League Cup on 2 December, which sent Derby into the semi-finals for the first time in 40 years. His final goals in a Derby shirt came against Charlton Athletic on 15 December, scoring a brace to level the game at 2–2. Ellington made only 5 more appearances before the end of the season, just 2 of them coming under new Derby manager Nigel Clough and both of them substitute appearances. Ellington finished joint top-scorer in the 2008–09 League Cup, with 6 goals, but after scoring just 3 league goals in 27 games, Clough decided not to take up the option of signing Ellington, preferring Rob Hulse, Chris Porter and Luke Varney in attack. Ellington subsequently returned to Watford.

=== Preston North End ===
Ellington signed for Preston North End on 13 January 2011 on loan until the end of the 2010–11 season. He made his debut as a substitute in the 1–1 draw with Leicester City. He scored his first goal in the last minute of the game against Coventry City. His second goal was against Sheffield United when Iain Hume put him through on goal.

=== Ipswich Town ===
Ellington signed a two-year contract for Ipswich Town on a free transfer on 21 June 2011, linking up with manager Paul Jewell for the third time. On 31 January 2013, Ipswich announced they had parted ways with Ellington by mutual consent.

=== Crewe Alexandra ===
On 8 March 2013, Ellington signed for Crewe Alexandra until the end of the 2012-13 season after a one-month trial. He left the club in July 2013 after the expiry of his contract.

=== Southport ===
On 17 October 2013, Ellington signed on non-contract terms for Conference Premier side Southport. However, after a change in management he was released by the club in December in order to make further additions to their squad.

=== Free agent ===
On 18 February 2014, Ellington joined Indonesian club Persija Jakarta on trial but decided to leave once he saw the setup and facilities.

By March 2015, Ellington had retired from playing.

== Personal life ==
In 2005, Ellington married a Bosnian woman, Alma from Tuzla, and after doing research, he converted to Islam and became a Muslim before they married.

In 2011, he set up the Association of Muslim Footballers, whose purpose is to provide a network for Muslim players and families, highlighting the positive Muslim role models within the professional game and working to improve relationships between players of other beliefs. In relation to how Ramadan affected his football, Ellington has stated "When I'm playing an away match, I won't fast, but I'll make up for the missed day afterwards. For training, there's not a problem either, as you can get your hydration and nutrients with the suhoor (the early pre-dawn breakfast) which then helps. The only difference is afterwards when the rest of the players go off [to eat] and you have to hang on for a while longer, until the iftar meal at sunset."

In 2008 he visited his wife's country of origin and expressed interest in playing for the Bosnia and Herzegovina national team. He is nicknamed The Duke after legendary jazz musician Duke Ellington. Ellington is from a sporting family; his cousin Lee Ellington is also a footballer.

== Career statistics ==
Appearances and goals by club, season and competition
Club	Season	League			FA Cup		League Cup		Other		Total	
Club	Season	Division	Apps	Goals	Apps	Goals	Apps	Goals	Apps	Goals	Apps	Goals
Walton & Hersham	1998–99	Isthmian League Premier Division	20	9	3	0	—		8 (Note: Three appearances one goal in Surrey Senior Cup; two appearances two goals in Isthmian League Full Members' Cup; one appearance one goal in FA Trophy; one appearance in Isthmian League Cup; one appearance in Southern Combination Cup)	4	31	13
Bristol Rovers	1998–99	Second Division	10	1	0	0	0	0	0	0	10	1
Bristol Rovers	1999–00	Second Division	37	4	1	0	1	0	2 (Note: Appearance(s) in Football League Trophy)	0	41	4
Bristol Rovers	2000–01	Second Division	42	15	1	0	5	2	3	1	51	18
Bristol Rovers	2001–02	Third Division	27	15	5	4	2	0	2	2	36	21
Bristol Rovers	Total		116	35	7	4	8	2	7	3	138	44
Wigan Athletic	2001–02	Second Division	3	2	—		—		—		3	2
Wigan Athletic	2002–03	Second Division	42	15	3	2	5	5	1	0	51	22
Wigan Athletic	2003–04	First Division	44	18	1	0	2	1	—		47	19
Wigan Athletic	2004–05	Championship	45	24	0	0	0	0	—		45	24
Wigan Athletic	Total		134	59	4	2	7	6	1	0	146	67
West Bromwich Albion	2005–06	Premier League	31	5	2	0	2	3	—		35	8
West Bromwich Albion	2006–07	Championship	34	10	2	0	2	1	3 (Note: Appearances in Championship play-offs)	0	41	11
West Bromwich Albion	2007–08	Championship	3	0	0	0	2	1	—		5	1
West Bromwich Albion	Total		68	15	4	0	6	5	3	0	81	20
Watford	2007–08	Championship	34	4	2	0	—		2	0	38	4
Watford	2008–09	Championship	0	0	0	0	0	0	—		0	0
Watford	2009–10	Championship	17	1	0	0	1	0	—		18	1
Watford	2010–11	Championship	0	0	0	0	0	0	—		0	0
Watford	Total		51	5	2	0	1	0	2	0	56	5
Derby County (loan)	2008–09	Championship	27	3	1	0	4	6	—		32	9
Preston North End (loan)	2010–11	Championship	18	2	0	0	0	0	—		18	2
Ipswich Town	2011–12	Championship	15	0	1	0	1	0	—		17	0
Ipswich Town	2012–13	Championship	2	0	0	0	0	0	—		2	0
Ipswich Town	Total		17	0	1	0	1	0	0	0	19	0
Scunthorpe United (loan)	2012–13	League One	6	0	0	0	0	0	0	0	6	0
Crewe Alexandra	2012–13	League One	8	0	0	0	0	0	0	0	8	0
Southport	2013–14	Conference Premier	3	0	2	1	—		1 (Note: Appearance in FA Trophy)	1	6	2
Career total			468	128	24	7	27	19	22	8	541	162

== Honours ==
Wigan Athletic

- Football League Championship runner-up: 2004–05
- Football League Second Division: 2002–03

Individual

- PFA Team of the Year: 2001–02 Third Division, 2004–05 Championship
- Football League Cup top goalscorer: 2002–03, 2008–09
- Football League Championship Golden Boot: 2004–05
- Nominated for the Best at Sport award at the British Muslim Awards: 2014
