= Rob Davies (footballer) =

Welsh footballer

Personal information
- Full name: Robert John Davies
- Date of birth: 24 March 1987 (age 39)
- Place of birth: Tywyn, Wales
- Height: 5 ft 11 in (1.80 m)
- Position: Midfielder

Team information
- Current team: Tywyn & Bryncrug

Senior career*
| Years | Team | Apps | (Gls) |
| 2006–2007 | West Bromwich Albion | 12 | (0) |
| 2006 | → Kidderminster Harriers (loan) | 4 | (0) |
| 2007–2008 | Barakaldo | 11 | (1) |
| 2008 | Hednesford Town | 10 | (3) |
| 2008 | Oxford United | 1 | (0) |
| 2008–2017 | Worcester City | 55 | (5) |
| 2017–2019 | Billericay Town | 24 | (3) |
| 2019– | Tywyn & Bryncrug | | |

International career
| | Wales U21 | 6 | (0) |
- * Club domestic league appearances and goals as of 11:39, 30 July 2008 (UTC)

Robert John Davies (born 24 March 1987) is a retired Welsh footballer. Davies formerly played for Billericay FC and signed for the Essex-based outfit in a three-year deal rumoured to be worth £1,250,000. Prior to that, he played for Wrexham, and signed for West Bromwich Albion in the 2003–04 season for a nominal fee. Davies has also represented Wales at the Under-17, 19 and 21. Davies was formerly a regular to reality TV having appeared in shows on MTV and ITV 2.

== Career ==
Davies made his senior debut for West Brom in the FA Cup third round replay against Reading on 17 January 2006 at the Madejski Stadium, at the age of 18 years, which Albion lost 3–2 after extra time. Davies came on as a substitute for Junichi Inamoto in the 89th minute, but it proved to be the Welshman's only senior game for the club.

In November 2006 he moved to Kidderminster Harriers on loan for a month, while in March 2007 he was taken on trial by Colchester United.

He was released by Albion at the end of the 2006–07 season, and was offered a two-year contract at Spanish side Barakaldo CF. After a nightmare spell in Spain, Davies returned to England, where he was thrown a lifeline by Northern Premier League club Hednesford Town, who signed him in February 2008. He played ten times for the Pitmen, scoring three goals, before he was released at the end of the season. Hednesford had offered Davies a contract, but he decided to look elsewhere for a deal. He joined Oxford United in the Conference National on a short-term deal in July 2008 after a trial at the club.

Following his release by Oxford on 28 August 2008, he joined Conference South club Worcester City and signed a one-year deal, he then renewed terms at the end of the 2008–09 season.

On 27 July 2017, he signed for Billericay Town after impressing during pre-season.
