= 2007 New Year Honours =

British royal recognitions

The New Year Honours 2007 were appointments made by some of the 16 Commonwealth realms to various orders and honours to recognise and reward good works by citizens of those countries. The New Year Honours are awarded as part of the New Year celebrations at the start of January.

The New Year Honours were announced on 30 December 2006 in the United Kingdom, New Zealand, Cook Islands, The Bahamas, Grenada, Solomon Islands, Tuvalu, Saint Vincent and the Grenadines, Belize, Antigua and Barbuda, and Saint Christopher and Nevis.

The recipients of honours are displayed as they were styled before their new honour and arranged by the country (in order of precedence) whose ministers advised The Queen on the appointments, then by honour with grades i.e. Knight/Dame Grand Cross, Knight/Dame Commander etc. and then divisions i.e. Civil, Diplomatic and Military as appropriate.

The list is incomplete.

== United Kingdom ==
=== Knight Bachelor ===
- Keith Onyema Ajegbo, OBE, lately Headteacher, Deptford Green School, Lewisham, London. For services to Education.
- Ian Charles Franklin Andrews, CBE, TD, Second Permanent Under-Secretary of State, Ministry of Defence.
- Geoffrey Lionel Bindman. For services to Human Rights.
- Dr John Richard Grenfell Bradfield, CBE. For services to Science, Business and to the community in Cambridge.
- Alderman David William Brewer, CMG, JP, lately Lord Mayor of London. For services to the City of London.
- Robert William Kenneth Crawford, Director-General, Imperial War Museum. For services to Museums.
- Howard Dalton, Chief Scientific Adviser, Department for Environment, Food and Rural Affairs and Professor in the Department of Biological Sciences, University of Warwick.
- Professor Gordon William Duff, Professor of Molecular Medicine, Director of Molecular and Genetic Medicine and Medical Research Dean, Sheffield University. For services to Public Health.
- James Dyson, CBE, Founder and Chair, Dyson. For services to Business.
- Professor Malcolm Green, lately Vice-Principal, Faculty of Medicine, Imperial College and Head, National Heart and Lung Institute. For services to Medicine.
- Philip Roy Hampton, Chair, J Sainsbury plc. For public service.
- Michael De Courcy Fraser Holroyd, CBE, Writer. For services to Literature.
- Kenneth Donald John Macdonald, QC, Director of Public Prosecutions and Head of Crown Prosecution Service.
- Herbert William Massie, CBE, Chair, Disability Rights Commission. For services to disabled people.
- David Edward Murray, Chair, Murray International Holdings Ltd. For services to Business in Scotland.
- Professor John James O'Reilly, lately Chief Executive, Engineering and Physical Sciences Research Council. For services to Science.
- His Honour Stephen John Lindsay Oliver, QC, Presiding Special Commissioner and President, VAT and Duties Tribunals; President, Financial Services and Markets Tribunal. For public service.
- Michael Derek Vaughan Rake, Chair, KPMG. For services to the Accountancy Profession.
- Professor George Peter Scott, Vice-Chancellor, Kingston University. For services to Higher Education.
- George Albert Shearing, O.B.E., Jazz Pianist and Composer. For services to Music.
- Kevin Smith, C.B.E., Chief Executive, GKN. For services to Industry.
- Professor John Edward Tooke, Dean, Peninsula Medical School, Honorary Consultant Physician, Royal Devon and Exeter NHS Foundation Trust. For services to Medicine.

Diplomatic service and overseas list

- George Desmond Lorenz De Silva, Q.C., lately The Prosecutor to the Special Court for Sierra Leone.
- Geoffrey Nice, QC. For services to international criminal justice in and for the former Yugoslavia.
- Professor James Fraser Stoddart. For services to chemistry and molecular nanotechnology.

=== Order of the Bath ===
==== Knight Commander of the Order of the Bath (KCB) ====
Military Division

- Lieutenant General Frederick Richard Viggers, CMG, MBE (492992)

==== Companion of the Order of the Bath (CB) ====
Military Division

- Vice Admiral Robin Paul Boissier
- Rear Admiral Philip Lawrence Wilcocks, DSC
- Lieutenant General Robin Vaughan Brims, CBE, DSO (490334)
- Major General Keith Harington Cima (498895), late Corps of Royal Engineers.
- Major General Andrew Richard Evelyn De Cardonnel Stewart, C.B.E. (493787), late Light Dragoons.

Civil Division

- John Codling, Finance Director General, Department for Work and Pensions.
- Dr. Terence Robin Fellgett, Director and Deputy Head, Economic and Domestic Affairs Secretariat, Cabinet Office.
- Richard Mitchell Henderson, solicitor, Office of the Solicitor to the Scottish Executive.
- Bernard Herdan, Executive Director, Identity and Passport Service, Home Office.
- Dr. Colin Peter Hicks, lately Director-General, British National Space Centre and Member, Natural Environment Research Council. For services to Science.
- Ronald John Marchant, Chief Executive, Patent Office, Department of Trade and Industry.
- Anthony Joseph Henry Orhnial, director, Personal Tax and Welfare Reform, HM Treasury.
- Andrew Charles Bruce Ramsay, Director-General, Culture, Creativity and Economy Group, Department for Culture, Media and Sport.
- Maurice John Smith, lately H.M. Chief Inspector of Schools, Office for Standards in Education, Department for Education and Skills.
- Patrick Thomas Toal, Permanent Secretary, Department of Agriculture and Rural Development, Northern Ireland Executive.
- Peter Thomas Wanless, director, School Performance and Reform, Department for Education and Skills.
- Dr. David Wynford Williams, lately National Hydrographer and Chief Executive, United Kingdom Hydrographic Office, Ministry of Defence.
- Trevor Adrian Woolley, Finance Director, Ministry of Defence.

Diplomatic service and overseas list

- Dr. Geoffrey Keith Taylor, counsellor, Foreign and Commonwealth Office

=== Order of St Michael and St George ===
==== Knight Commander of the Order of St Michael and St George (KCMG) ====
- Mark Malloch Brown formerly deputy secretary general, United Nations
- William Geoffrey Ehrman ambassador, Beijing
- John McLeod Scarlett Director, Secret Intelligence Service (MI6)

==== Companion of the Order of St Michael and St George (CMG) ====
- Keith George Bloomfield, formerly Ambassador to Kathmandu
- Simon James Buckle, formerly Deputy Head of Mission, British Embassy, Kabul
- Professor Victor Bulmer-Thomas, director, Royal Institute of International Affairs
- Andrew George Tyndale Cooper, Counsellor, FCO
- Martin Stuart Davidson, Deputy Director-General, British Council
- Michael George Richardson, Counsellor, FCO
- David Alexander Warren, Counsellor, FCO
- Timothy Andrew Willasey-Wilsey, Counsellor, FCO

=== Royal Victorian Order ===
==== Knight Commander of the Royal Victorian Order (KCVO) ====
- Philip Alan Reid, Keeper of the Privy Purse
- Alan William Waterworth, formerly Lord-Lieutenant for Merseyside

==== Commander of the Royal Victorian Order (CVO) ====
- Lieutenant General Sir John Norman Stewart Arthur, K.C.B., formerly Lord-Lieutenant of the Stewartry of Kirkcudbright.
- Major Edward Stuart Orr-Ewing, formerly Lord-Lieutenant of Wigtownshire.
- John Terence Moulton Guest, formerly Executive Director of Round Square.
- Captain Ronald Charles Cunningham-Jardine, formerly Lord-Lieutenant of Dumfries.
- Bernard Trevor Matthews, C.B.E. For services to The Duke of Edinburgh's Award.
- Sir Basil Henry David Montgomery, Bt., formerly Lord-Lieutenant of Perth and Kinross.
- Peter Charles Orton. For services to Children's Literacy.
- Michael Alan Pomery, former Partner, Hewitt.

==== Lieutenant of the Royal Victorian Order (LVO) ====
- David Kim Hempleman-Adams, O.B.E., D.L. For services to The Duke of Edinburgh's Award Scheme.
- Nigel Argentine Alington, formerly Executive Director, Aon Limited.
- Roy Thomas Brown, M.V.O., Property Manager, London Palaces, Royal Household.
- Christopher James Carnegie. For services to The Duke of Edinburgh's Award Charter for Business (Canada).
- Claire Elizabeth, Mrs. Cox, M.V.O., formerly Senior Secretary, Household of The Duke of Edinburgh.
- Jonathan Paul Grimwade, Manager, Royal Studs.
- Lynda Margaret, Mrs. Hopkins, M.V.O., Clerk to the West Midlands Lieutenancy.
- Mary, Mrs. de Bellefeuille-Percy (to be dated 6 November 2006). Formerly Director of Honours Chancellery, Government House, Ottawa, Canada.
- Colonel Christopher John Pickup, O.B.E., Secretary, Royal Warrant Holders' Association.
- Julian Richer, formerly non-executive Director, Duchy Originals.
- Captain David John Bingham Younger, formerly Secretary, Royal Company of Archers.

==== Member of the Royal Victorian Order (MVO) ====
- Brian William Andrews, B.E.M., Superintendent, State Apartments, St. James's Palace.
- Eric Clifford Birbeck. For services to The Queen.
- Inspector Peter Anthony Brown, Metropolitan Police. For services to Royalty Protection.
- St. John Alexander Burch. For services to the Royal Collection.
- David George Clark, Locksmith/Fitter, Royal Household.
- Patricia, Mrs. Curtis, Investiture Clerk, Central Chancery of the Orders of Knighthood.
- David George William Fisher, Lieutenancy Officer, Lord Lieutenancy of South Yorkshire.
- Sergeant Piers Godwin Brandling-Harris, Metropolitan Police. For services to Royalty Protection.
- Miss Penelope Jane Henderson, Secretary, Royal Windsor Horse Show.
- James Hippisley Kidner, formerly Deputy Private Secretary to The Prince of Wales and The Duchess of Cornwall.
- Stephen Henry Ronald Marshall, R.V.M., Yeoman of the Glass and China Pantry, Royal Household.
- Ian John Pepper, formerly Senior Assurance Officer, HM Revenue and Customs.
- John Potts, Maintenance Manager, Ascot Racecourse.
- David John Read, Deputy Superintendent, Holyrood Palace.
- Michael John Taylor, Assistant to the Master of the Household, Finance, Royal Household.
- Ms Josephine Elizabeth Thwaites, Project Manager, Kew Palace.
- Raymond Wheaton, R.V.M., Page of the Chambers, Royal Household.

=== Order of the British Empire ===
==== Knight Grand Cross of the Order of the British Empire (GBE) ====
Military Division

- General Sir Timothy John Granville-Chapman, K.C.B., C.B.E., A.D.C.Gen (484406), late Royal Regiment of Artillery.

==== Knight Commander of the Order of the British Empire (KBE) ====
Military Division

- Air Marshal Graham Anthony Miller, C.B.E. (1962030D), Royal Air Force.

Civil Division

Diplomatic and Overseas

- Professor Richard George Andrew Feachem, Executive Director, Global Fund for Aids, Tuberculosis and Malaria

==== Dame Commander of the Order of the British Empire (DBE) ====
- Yasmin Bevan, Headtecher, Denbigh High School, Luton, Bedfordshire. For services to Education.
- Professor Margaret Mary Douglas, CBE, Fellow of University College London and Professor Emerita, Department of Anthropology. For services to Anthropology.
- Professor Ann Patricia Dowling, CBE, Professor of Mechanical Engineering, University of Cambridge. For services to Science.
- Evelyn Elizabeth Ann Glennie, OBE, Percussionist. For services to Music.
- Professor Joan Margaret Higgins, Chair, Christie Hospital NHS Trust, Manchester. For services to Healthcare.
- Ann Elizabeth Mary Leslie. For services to Journalism.
- Mary Elizabeth Marsh, Director and Chief Executive, National Society for the Prevention of Cruelty to Children. For services to Families and Children.
- Josephine Williams, CBE, Chief Executive, Mencap. For services to People with Learning Disabilities.

==== Commander of the Order of the British Empire (CBE) ====
Military Division

Royal Navy

- Commodore Nicolas Edwin Baldock, Royal Navy.
- Commodore Michael Andrew Bowker, Royal Navy.
- Commodore Anthony Stanley Miklinski, Royal Navy.

Army

- Brigadier Ian Conway Dale (505231), late Corps of Royal Electrical and Mechanical Engineers.
- Colonel Edward Peter Davies, M.B.E. (512404), late The Light Infantry.
- Brigadier John Duncan Deverell, O.B.E. (500262), late Royal Irish Regiment.
- Colonel David Charles Eccles, O.B.E. (506581), late Royal Tank Regiment.
- Colonel David Stephen Short (516720), late Army Air Corps.

Royal Air Force

- Group Captain Simon Owen Falla, D.S.O. (8027341P), Royal Air Force.
- Group Captain Russell John Torbet (8141177G), Royal Air Force.
- Air Commodore Peter Whalley, A.D.C. (8022833B), Royal Air Force.
- Air Commodore Graham Alan Wright, O.B.E. (5203227X), Royal Air Force.

Civil Division

- Norman Ackroyd. For services to Engraving and to Printing.
- Ms Nina Lizette Barough, Founder and Chief Executive, Walk the Walk Worldwide (Breast Cancer Charity). For services to Healthcare.
- Ms Susan Barratt, Headteacher, Bournville Junior School, Birmingham. For services to Education.
- Mary Helen, Mrs. Bayne, C.V.O., Grade 5, Home Office.
- Clive Ronald Reath Bennett, Chief Executive, Driver and Vehicle Licensing Agency, Department for Transport.
- Dr. George Berwick, Headteacher, Ravens Wood School, Bromley, London. For services to Education.
- John Boyington, Deputy Director General, Health and Care Partnerships and Programme Director, Health and Offender Partnerships, Department of Health.
- Andrew Michael Bridges, HM Chief Inspector of Probation. For services to the Criminal Justice System.
- Professor Norma Brook, lately President, Health Professions Council. For services to Healthcare.
- Professor Allan Burns, lately Director, Diageo Scotland. For services to Business in Scotland.
- Kevin James Patrick Cahill, Chief Executive, Comic Relief. For charitable services.
- Bryan Carr, Chair and Chief Executive, Lincolnshire Electronics Company. For services to Business in the East Midlands.
- Stephen Carter, Chief Executive, Ofcom. For services to the Communications Industry.
- Roger Ralph Chapman, Vice-Chair, James Fisher Defence. For services to the Shipping Industry.
- The Right Reverend Alan Chesters, lately Chair, North West Rural Affairs Forum. For services to the community in the North West.
- Ms Imogen Cooper, Pianist. For services to Music.
- Margaret Rosemary, Mrs. Cooper, Chair, Independent Living Funds. For services to disabled people.
- Miss Charlotte Copeland, Chief Executive, The Rent Service, Department for Work and Pensions.
- Colin Ralph Cramphorn, Q.P.M., D.L., lately Chief Constable, West Yorkshire Police. For services to the Police. (To be dated 28 November 2006.)
- Ms Mabel Davis, Headteacher, Heathlands Special School, Hertfordshire. For services to Special Needs Education.
- Professor Richard Demarco, O.B.E. For services to the Arts.
- Dr. Robert Royds Dickson, Oceanographic and Climate Scientist, Centre for Environment, Fisheries and Aquaculture Science, Department for Environment, Food and Rural Affairs.
- Wilma, Mrs. Dickson, Head of Division, Justice Department, Scottish Executive.
- Barry Dixon, Q.F.S.M., chief fire officer, Greater Manchester County Fire Service. For services to the Fire and Rescue Service.
- Professor Jonathan Drori, lately Director, Culture Online, Department for Culture, Media and Sport.
- Sheila, Mrs. Drury, O.B.E., lately Chair, Education and Learning Wales. For services to Industry, Education and Training in Wales.
- George Gordon Edington, Chair, NCH. For services to Children.
- Gareth Owen Edwards, M.B.E. For services to Sport, in particular to Rugby.
- Professor William James Feast, Emeritus Professor, University of Durham. For services to Polymer Chemistry.
- David Fish, director, Africa, Department for International Development.
- Dr. Neil Goodwin, Chief Executive, former Greater Manchester Strategic Health Authority. For services to the NHS.
- Michael David William Gooley, Chair, Trailfinders Travel Agency. For services to the Travel Industry and to Charity.
- Ms Susan Ann Gray, Director, Propriety and Ethics, and Head of Management Unit for Private Offices, Cabinet Office.
- Peter Greenaway, director, Painter and Writer. For services to the Film Industry.
- Professor Kenneth John Gregory, Vice-Chair, University of Southampton Solent Governing Body. For services to Geography and to Higher Education.
- Professor Haig Gulvanessian, lately Director, Construction Division, Building Research Establishment. For services to the Construction Industry.
- Ms Roswyn Hakesley-Brown, President, Royal College of Nursing. For services to Healthcare.
- Terence David Hands, Director. For services to Drama.
- Dr. James Maurice Hart, Q.P.M., lately Commissioner, City of London Police. For services to the Police.
- Professor Sheila Glennis Haworth, Professor of Developmental Cardiology; Head, Cardiovascular and Respiratory Sciences, Institute of Child Health, University College London. For services to the NHS.
- Councillor Michael Francis Henry, leader, Gateshead Metropolitan Borough Council. For services to Local Government.
- Professor Gordon Hewitt, Professor of International Business and Corporate Strategy, University of Michigan. For services to Business.
- Larry Hirst, Country General Manager, IBM UK. For services to the IT Industry.
- Professor Andrew Hopper, Professor of Computer Technology, University of Cambridge. For services to the Computer Industry.
- Ms Margaret Howell, Fashion Designer. For services to the Retail Industry.
- Ms Patricia Geraldine Howse, Assistant Director, Serious Fraud Office.
- Ms Carole Hudson, Chief Executive, Metropolitan Borough of St Helens. For services to Local Government.
- Professor Donald James Jeffries, Professor of Virology and Head, Department of Medical Microbiology, St. Bartholomew's and Royal London Hospitals. For services to Medicine.
- Ms Penelope Anne Constance Keith, O.B.E. D.L., Actress. For charitable services.
- Professor Christine Elizabeth King, D.L., Vice-Chancellor and Chief Executive, Staffordshire University. For services to Higher Education.
- Ms Angela Ann Knight, Chief Executive Officer, Association of Private Client Investment Managers and Stockbrokers. For services to the Financial Services Industry.
- Professor Harry Andre Lee, Consultant Physician and Head of the Gulf Veterans' Medical Assessment Programme.
- Professor David Peter Lock, Founder, David Lock Associates and Chair, Town and Country Planning Association. For services to Urban Design.
- Christopher Logue, Writer and Poet. For services to Literature.
- John David Mackie, lately Chief Executive, British Venture Capital Association. For services to Business.
- Roger Madelin, Joint Chief Executive, Argent Group plc. For services to Sustainable Development.
- Donald Makepeace, director, Workforce Change Team, HM Revenue and Customs.
- Simon Jeffrey Maxwell, director, Overseas Development Institute. For services to International Development.
- Professor Doreen McBarnet, Professor of Socio-Legal Studies, University of Oxford. For services to Social Science.
- Mary, Mrs. McLaughlin, Headteacher, Notre Dame High School and Principal, Notre Dame New Learning Community, Glasgow. For services to Education.
- Professor Anne Mills, Head, Department of Public Health and Policy, Health Economics and Financing Programme, London School of Hygiene and Tropical Medicine. For services to Medicine.
- Ioan Morgan, Principal, Warwickshire College. For services to Further Education.
- Peter William Mount, Chair, NHS Confederation and Chair, Central Manchester and Manchester Children's University Hospitals NHS Trust. For services to the NHS.
- Gavin Ellis Neath, National Manager, Unilever UK. For services to the Food Industry.
- Professor Stephen John Nickell, lately Member, Monetary Policy Committee and Warden, Nuffield College, University of Oxford. For services to Economics.
- Dr. Farhan Ahmad Nizami, Founder Director, Oxford Centre for Islamic Studies. For services to Islamic Studies.
- Richard Paniguian, co-Chair, Egyptian-British Business Council. For services to Business.
- Professor Barbara Ann Parfitt, Dean, School of Nursing, Glasgow Caledonian University. For services to International Healthcare.
- Professor Michael Henry Parkinson, director, European Institute for Urban Affairs, Liverpool John Moores University. For services to Urban Regeneration.
- David Humphrey Gavin Penney, Vice-President, BT Global Business Markets. For services to the Communications Industry.
- Professor John Douglas Perkins, Vice-President and Dean, Faculty of Engineering and Physical Sciences, University of Manchester. For services to Science and Engineering.
- Professor David Garel Rhys, O.B.E., Chair, Welsh Government's Economic Research Advisory Panel. For services to Economic Research in Wales.
- Professor Genevra Richardson, Professor of Law, King's College London, University of London. For services to Public Law.
- Stephen Blakeney Ridgway, Chief Executive, Virgin Atlantic. For services to Civil Aviation.
- Peter William Rogers, director, Stanhope. For services to the Construction Industry.
- Paul Rogerson, Chief Executive, Leeds City Council. For services to Local Government.
- Ian Simon MacGregor Russell. For services to Young People and to Volunteering.
- Dr. John Milford Rutter, Composer and Conductor. For services to Music.
- David Simons. For services to the Retail Industry.
- Professor Alexander McCall Smith, Writer. For services to Literature.
- Michael John Snell, lately Principal and Chief Executive, Brockenhurst College, Hampshire. For services to Further Education.
- Ramniklal Chhaganlal Solanki, O.B.E. For services to Publishing and to Community Relations.
- Ms Sarah Ann Spencer, Chair, Equality and Diversity Forum and Associate Director, COMPAS, University of Oxford. For services to Equal Opportunities and Human Rights.
- Ms Hilary Susan Spurling, Writer. For services to Literature.
- Roderick David Stewart, Singer and Songwriter. For services to Music.
- Jonathan Symonds, chief finance officer, AstraZeneca. For services to the Pharmaceutical Industry.
- Professor Malcolm Stuart Tanner, Emeritus Professor of Paediatrics, Sheffield Children's Hospital. For services to Medicine.
- Dr. Martyn Charles Thomas. For services to Software Engineering.
- Colin Gerald Dryden Thubron, Travel Writer and Novelist. For services to Literature.
- Professor Stephen Tomlinson, lately Provost and Deputy Vice-Chancellor, Cardiff University. For services to Medicine.
- Graham Edward Tuppen, Chief Executive, Enterprise Inns. For services to the Hospitality Industry.
- Dr. Patrick Charles Upson, managing director, Enrichment Technology Company Limited. For services to Industry.
- District Judge Michael John Walker, Honorary Secretary, The Association of District Judges. For services to the Administration of Justice.
- Patrick Watters, J.P., President, Convention of Scottish Local Authorities. For services to Local Government.
- Ms Karen Wheeler, Change Programme Director, Her Majesty's Courts Service.
- John Christensen Willis, D.L., lately Chief Executive, Salford City Council. For services to Local Government.
- Ian Wilson, Corporate Director of Social Services, London Borough of Tower Hamlets. For services to Social Care.
- Primrose Eileen, Mrs. Wilson, O.B.E., lately Trustee, National Heritage Memorial Fund and Northern Ireland Chair, Heritage Lottery Fund. For services to Conservation and to Heritage.
- John Wood, Actor. For services to Drama.
- Professor John Wood, Chief Executive, Central Laboratories of the Research Council. For services to Science.

Diplomatic Service and Overseas List

- Brigadier Christopher John Anthony Hammerbeck, C.B. For services to British business interests in Hong Kong.
- Michael Anthony Lambert, formerly Executive Vice-President, Commonwealth Magistrates' and Judges' Association.
- Roger Loewyn Munnings. For services to British business interests in Russia.
- Peter Nightingale, lately Chief Executive, China Britain Business Council. For services to trade.
- Major General David Nial Creagh O'Morchoe, C.B., M.B.E. For services to British ex-servicemen and women in Ireland.
- Dr. Dickson Poon. For services to UK-Asia business interests.
- Christopher John Rodrigues. For services to British business interests and charitable works in the UK and US.

==== Officer of the Order of the British Empire (OBE) ====
- Kyle McClean Alexander, Chief Executive, Laganside Corporation. For services to Regeneration in Northern Ireland.
- Brian Allan, lately Director, Foundation Degree Development, University of Salford. For services to Higher Education.
- John Courtney Allcock, Associate Director, National Workforce Programme, Department of Health.
- Neville Robert Allport, Chief Executive, Picture Financial Group. For services to the Financial Services Industry and to charitable services in Wales.
- Trevor Lloyd Baker, services to the National Health Service in the West Midlands
- Douglas Crombie Anderson, Founder, Optos plc. For services to Life Sciences.
- Miss Jayne Anderson, Grade B2, Ministry of Defence.
- Professor Muhammad Anwar, Professor of Ethnic Relations, University of Warwick. For services to Higher Education.
- Garth Armstrong, Senior Economic Adviser, Western Balkans, Department for International Development.
- Celeste, Mrs. Dandeker-Arnold, M.B.E., Artistic Director, CandoCo Dance Company. For services to Dance.
- David John Astley, Chief Executive, St. George's Healthcare NHS Trust. For services to the NHS.
- Ms Celia Atherton, Director, Research in Practice. For services to Children and Families.
- Richard Henry Aust, Headteacher, Chadsgrove Special School, Worcestershire. For services to Special Needs Education.
- Professor Richard Nigel Bailey, lately Chair, Heritage Lottery Fund's Committee for the North East. For services to Heritage.
- Robert Lawrence Banner, Chair, Rethink Charity. For services to Mental Health.
- Dr. John Charles Barrett, Head, Zimbabwe Office, Department for International Development.
- Trevor John Bayley, lately Acting Chief Executive and Director of Savings, National Savings and Investments, H.M. Treasury.
- Christopher Ronald Beale, Chair, Institute of Directors. For services to Business.
- Ms Linda Bellos, Co-Chair, Lesbian, Gay, Bisexual and Transgender Advisory Group. For services to Diversity.
- Ian Charles Bennett, Principal and Chief Executive, Strode Tertiary College, Somerset. For services to Further Education.
- Ms Linda Kristin Bennett, Founder and Designer, LK Bennett. For services to the Fashion Industry.
- Professor Peter Beresford, Professor of Social Policy and Director, Centre for Citizen Participation, Brunel University and Chair, Shaping Our Lives. For services to Social Care.
- John Berry, Senior Manager, Her Majesty's Prison Service.
- Sister Rosaire Boden, Principal, Dominican College, Belfast. For services to Education in Northern Ireland.
- Stephanie Ann, Mrs. Boyer (Miss Boobier), Head, Face-to-Face Transformation, H.M. Revenue and Customs.
- Douglas Frederick Boynton, Principal, Telford College. For services to Further Education in Shropshire.
- Mary Rosamund, Mrs. Briggs, Chief Executive, Seven Stories, The Centre for Children's Books. For services to Literature.
- Jacqueline, Mrs. Brookes, Chief Executive Officer and Executive Director, Federation of Communication Services. For services to the Communications Industry.
- Nicolas Milne Brown, Principal, Oldham Sixth Form College. For services to Further Education.
- Paul Hacker Brown, Band A, Prime Minister's Office.
- Professor Susanne Moira Brown, Director and Chief Scientist, Crusade Laboratories Ltd. For services to Healthcare.
- Ms Sylvia Brown, Chief Executive, Action with Communities in Rural England. For services to Rural Communities.
- Sandra, Mrs. Brusby, Chief Executive, Business Link Cheshire and Warrington. For services to Business.
- Paul Anthony Bush, Chef De Mission, Scottish Commonwealth Games Team. For services to Sport.
- Jennifer Susan, Mrs. Byers, lately Executive Director, Donor Services, Charities Aid Foundation. For services to Charity.
- Anthony James Cairns, Deputy Chair, Leeds Bradford International Airport. For services to Civil Aviation and to the community in West Yorkshire.
- Anthony Campbell, Principal, St. Richards Catholic College, Bexhill-on-Sea, East Sussex. For services to Education.
- Ian Archer Hamilton Carstairs, M.B.E., Conservationist. For services to Heritage in Yorkshire and the Humber.
- Kenneth Carstairs, Senior Manager, Lothians, H.M. Revenue and Customs.
- Ms Jane Cavanagh, Founder and Chief Executive, SCI Entertainment Group plc. For services to the Computer Games Industry.
- Peter Michael Chapman, Founder, Shekinah Mission, Plymouth. For services to Homeless People.
- Ms Michelle Chinery, Co-Chair, Learning Disability Task Force. For services to disabled people.
- Daniel Clark. For services to the National Probation Service.
- Professor Margaret MacDonald Clark, Emeritus Professor of Education, University of Birmingham and Visiting Professor, Newman College of Higher Education, Birmingham. For services to Early Years Education.
- Air Commodore Charles Henry Clarke, RAF (Retd). For services to the Royal Air Forces Ex-Prisoners of War Association.
- John Coales. Founder and lately Chairman, Francis Coales Charitable Foundation. For services to Conservation.
- Quentin Coey, Chief Executive, Belfast City Hospital Trust. For services to Healthcare in Northern Ireland. Peter Coomber, Project Manager, eDelivery Group, Department for Constitutional Affairs.
- Debbie Coulter, Deputy General-Secretary, GMB Trade Union. For services to Employment Relations.
- Stan Crawford, Managing Director, Sherwood Energy Village. For services to Business.
- Brigid, Lady Crofton, lately Trustee and Vice-Chair, UNICEF UK. For services to Children and Families Overseas.
- John Verdi d'Abbro, Headteacher, New Rush Hall Special School, Redbridge, London. For services to Special Needs Education.
- Ann Edith, Mrs. Darling, J.P., D.L. For services to the Administration of Justice and to the community in Tyneside.
- David Johnston Davies, lately Executive Director, The Football Association. For services to Sport.
- Geoffrey Neil Davies, Financial Director, Tower Colliery, Rhondda Cynon TaV. For services to the Mining Industry.
- John Elwyn Davies, lately Member, Local Government Boundary Commission for Wales. For public service.
- Neil Davies, lately Chair, National Governors' Council and Co-Chair, National Governors' Association. For services to Education.
- Peter John Davies, Head of Business Design, Jobcentre Plus, Department for Work and Pensions.
- Donald Malcolm Dempsey, Director of ESFVON. For services to Voluntary and Community Organisations in the North East.
- Susan Elizabeth, Mrs. Dewey. For services to the Sea Cadet Corps in Nottinghamshire.
- Charles Dhanowa, Registrar, Competition Appeal Tribunal. For services to Competition Law.
- Rodney William Dickinson, Business Development Director, FirstGroup plc. For services to Public Transport.
- Susan Elizabeth Digby (Lady Eatwell), Founder and Principal, The Voices Foundation. For services to Music Education.
- Councillor James Doig, Leader, Perth and Kinross Council. For services to Local Government.
- Miss Zoe Dominic. For services to Arts Photography.
- Christopher Peter Dorries, Chair, Yorkshire and Humber Mass Fatalities Working Group. For services to Emergency Planning.
- Miss Lisa Dougherty, Nurse Consultant, The Royal Marsden Hospital. For services to the NHS.
- Thomas Herbert Drake, Interim Chief Executive, Scottish Qualifications Authority. For services to Education.
- Dr. Richard Dyer, lately Director, Babraham Institute, Cambridge. For services to Biology.
- Miss Susan Margaret Eades, Head, Tuberculosis Division, Department for Environment, Food and Rural Affairs.
- Toni Christine, Mrs. Eastwood, Training and Business Development Manager, Everywoman. For services to Equal Opportunities.
- Professor Kimmy Ai Ngor Eldridge, Professor and Deputy Head, Department of Health and Human Sciences, University of Essex. For services to Healthcare.
- Michael Henry Ellis, lately Fund Commissioner, Fund Distribution Ltd. For services to the Financial Services Industry.
- Huw Evans, lately Headteacher, Watchfield Primary School, Oxfordshire. For services to Education.
- Dr. Azhar Farooqi, General Medical Practitioner, East Leicester Medical Practice. For services to Healthcare.
- David Leonard Finnis, lately National Trust Manager, Marsden Moor Estate and Hardcastle Crags. For services to the communities of Marsden and Colne Valley.
- Donal Flanagan, Chief Executive, Council for Catholic Maintained Schools. For services to Education in Northern Ireland.
- Graham Fortune, Grade B1, Ministry of Defence.
- Ms Sue Foster, Assistant Director, Regeneration and Planning, London Borough of Hackney. For services to Planning.
- Joseph Sands Furphy, Member, Council for Nature Conservation and the Countryside. For services to Conservation in Northern Ireland.
- Rosemary Isabella, Mrs. Peters-Gallagher, Board Member, Invest Northern Ireland. For services to Business and to the community in Northern Ireland.
- Dr. Ashour Omar Gebreel, Special Co-ordinator, Complex Emergencies, World Health Organisation. For services to Healthcare Overseas.
- Dr. Michael Gibson, Head of Support for Learning Division, Education Department, Scottish Executive.
- James Harry Gill, Chief Executive, Liverpool Vision. For services to Regeneration.
- Professor William John Gillespie, T.D., lately Foundation Dean, Hull York Medical School. For services to Medicine.
- Dr. Garth Glentworth, Senior Governance Adviser. For public service overseas.
- Michael Redvers Golding, Yachtsman. For services to Sport.
- William Samuel Graham, Head of Education, Farming and Countryside Education. For services to Education and to Farming.
- Ms Sally Greene (Mrs. Bourne), Owner and Director, Old Vic Productions plc. For services to Drama.
- Alun Griffiths. For services to the Construction Industry and to the community in Wales.
- Professor Richard Grimes. For services to Pro Bono Legal Services.
- Garth Michael Guthrie. For services to Charity.
- The Reverend Thomas Norman Hamilton, Minister, Ballysillan Presbyterian Church, North Belfast. For services to Community Relations in Northern Ireland.
- Dr. Margaret Ann Harper, Consultant Obstetrician and Gynaecologist, Royal Group of Hospitals, Belfast and lately Senior Lecturer, Queen's University, Belfast. For services to Medicine.
- David John Heaton, Principal, Queen Elizabeth Sixth Form College, Darlington. For services to Further Education.
- Dr. Raymond John Heitzman. For services to Food Safety.
- Kevin Joseph Helferty. For public service.
- Margaret, Mrs. Hesketh. For services to the victims of domestic violence in Northern Ireland.
- Dr. David Gerald Hessayon. For services to Gardening and to Charity.
- Patricia Ann, Mrs. Heywood, lately Worldwide President, Mothers' Union. For charitable services.
- Richard Quintin Hoare, D.L. For charitable services through the Bulldog Trust.
- John Holland, Director of Operations, RAPID UK. For services to International Rescue.
- Allan St. John Holt, J.P. For services to Health Safety.
- Norman Jeffery, Area Director, Wiltshire, Her Majesty's Courts Service.
- Hugh Eric Allan Johnson, Author and Journalist. For services to Wine Making and to Horticulture.
- Patricia Ann, Mrs. Johnson, lately Headteacher, Hopwood Primary School, Rochdale. For services to Education.
- Hywel Pritchard Jones, Chief Executive, Mudiad Ysgolion Meithrin. For services to Education and to the Welsh Language.
- Teresa Grace, Mrs. Jones, J.P., Grade B1, Ministry of Defence.
- Ms Kathryn Kane, Constable, Merseyside Police. For services to the Police.
- Paul Stephen Keleghan. For public service.
- John Michael Kelly, Executive Chair, Gala Group. For services to the Gambling Industry.
- Councillor Mohammed Khan, Member, Blackburn with Darwen Metropolitan Borough Council. For services to Local Government.
- Ms Vanessa Jane Knapp, UK Representative, Company Law Committee, Council of the Bars and Law Societies of the EU. For services to Corporate Law.
- Fiona Denise, Mrs. Knight (Ms Street), lately Chair, United Kingdom Homecare Association. For services to disabled people.
- Roger David Verdon Knight, lately Secretary and Chief Executive, Marylebone Cricket Club. For services to Sport.
- Harmesh Lakhanpaul, Director, Peterborough Race Equality Council. For services to Community Relations.
- James Hugh Callum Laurie, Actor, Writer and Director. For services to Drama.
- Pamela Joan, Mrs. Lee, Pathfinder Manager, Jobcentre Plus, Department for Work and Pensions.
- Dr. Elizabeth Jane Leese, Senior Medical Officer, Department of Health.
- Dr. Richard John Light, Director of Research, Disability Awareness in Action. For services to disabled people.
- Ms Nusrat Mehboob Lilani, Creator, Asian Women of Achievement Awards. For charitable services.
- Michael Joseph Liston, Chief Executive, Jersey Electricity Company. For services to the Electrical Industry and to Charity.
- Simon Piers Dominic Loftus, lately Chairman, Adnams. For services to Business.
- David Cecil Lovell, lately Head of Public Affairs, Ordnance Survey, Department for Communities and Local Government.
- Brian Lymbery, Chair, Lewisham Primary Care Trust. For services to Healthcare and to the community in Lewisham, London.
- Professor Stuart Gowans Macpherson, Chair, Scottish Modernising Medical Careers Implementation Group. For services to Medicine in Scotland.
- Peter John Malim, Grade B2, Ministry of Defence.
- Ian Mason, Chair, Scottish Swimming. For services to Sport.
- The Reverend John Clyne Matthews, Deputy-Chair, Scottish Enterprise Glasgow. For services to Economic Development.
- Dr. Anne Christine McCartney, Director, Regional Microbiology Network, Health Protection Agency, London. For services to Public Health.
- Clare Imogen, Mrs. McCarty, Chief Executive, Clanmil Housing Association Limited. For services to Social Housing in Northern Ireland.
- Bertha, Mrs. McDougall, Interim Commissioner for Victims and Survivors. For services to the community in Northern Ireland.
- John Fraser McIvor, Chief Executive, Lincolnshire Primary Care Trust. For services to the NHS.
- Dr. Joseph McKee, Principal, City of Belfast School of Music. For services to Music.
- Ms Mary McKee, Director, Groundwork Northern Ireland. For services to the Environment and to Community Relations.
- Robert Francis McMinnis, Head of Tourism, Agency Liaison and Equality Division, Department of Enterprise, Trade and Investment, Northern Ireland Executive.
- Andrew McMorran, Principal, Ashfield Boys' High School, Belfast. For services to Education in Northern Ireland.
- Professor Geoffrey Peter Meen, Professor of Applied Economics, Department of Economics, University of Reading. For services to Social Housing.
- Professor Stephen Henry Miller, lately Deputy Vice-Chancellor, City University. For services to Higher Education and to the Olive Tree Project.
- Dr. Stuart Kinnaird Monro, Scientific Director, Our Dynamic Earth. For services to Science.
- Christopher Moody, Principal, Moulton College, Northampton. For services to Further Education and to Training.
- Isobel Margaret, Mrs. Morris, Director, Southwark and Child and Adolescent Services, South London and Maudsley NHS Trust. For services to Mental Health Care.
- Ms Elizabeth Joyce Moseley. For services to Youth Justice.
- Richard John Murphy. For services to Architecture.
- Rupert Gerald Nunes Nabarro, Founder, Investment Property Databank. For services to the Property Industry.
- Ms Kate Louise Nash, lately Chief Executive, Royal Association of Disability and Rehabilitation. For services to disabled people.
- Ernest Milwyn Nock. For services to Victim Support and to the community in Worcestershire and Herefordshire.
- Martin Lawrence Norfield, ESOL Adviser, Skills for Life Strategy Unit, Department for Education and Skills.
- Provost Patrick O'Brien, J.P., Provost, East Lothian Council. For services to Local Government.
- Kevin O'Sullivan, Chair, O'Sullivan and Graham. For services to Civil Engineering Overseas.
- Brian David Orrell, Trade Union Leader, British Maritime Professionals. For services to Seafarers.
- Patricia, Mrs. Osborne, Grade 7, Department of Health, Social Services and Public Safety, Northern Ireland Executive.
- Graham Frederick Payne, Director, RAPID UK. For services to International Rescue.
- Dr. Henry James Pearson, Managing Consultant, Detica Ltd. For services to the Ministry of Defence.
- Angela Mary, Mrs. Pedder, Chief Executive, Royal Devon and Exeter Hospital. For services to the NHS.
- Dennis Gordon Pepler, Technical Inspector, H.M. Revenue and Customs.
- Frank Joseph Perkins, J.P., H.M. Principal Inspector of Health and Safety, Health and Safety Executive, Department for Work and Pensions.
- Thomas Stuart Peryer, Director of Education, London Diocesan Board for Schools. For services to Education.
- Lynette Elaine, Mrs. Phillips, lately Chair, London Black and Ethnic Minority Network for NHS Staff and Allied Health Professionals. For services to Healthcare.
- Dr. Mike Phillips, Writer and Broadcaster. For services to Broadcasting.
- Steven Charles Pimlott, Theatre and Opera Director. For services to Drama.
- Professor Colin Douglas Alexander Porteous, Senior Researcher, The Mackintosh School of Architecture and the Glasgow School of Art, Glasgow. For services to Architecture.
- Edward Posey. For services to The Gaia Foundation.
- Mayo, Mrs. Perceval-Price, Vice-President, Industrial Tribunals and the Fair Employment Tribunal. For services to Employment Relations in Northern Ireland.
- Susan Mary, Mrs. Price, Executive Director, Groundwork, Wales. For services to Regeneration in Wales.
- Dr. Heather Margaret Murray Reid, Meteorologist and Presenter, BBC Scotland. For services to Physics.
- Novlette Elizabeth, Mrs. Rennie, Director, Sporting Equals. For services to Diversity in Sport.
- The Reverend Canon James John Richardson. For services to the Church of England.
- Janet Irene, Mrs. Roberts, Headteacher, All Saints Church of England Junior School, Fleet, Hampshire. For services to Education.
- Professor Keith Roberts. For services to Plant Biology.
- David Bruce Robertson, Director of Education, Culture and Sport, Highland Council. For services to Education.
- Ms Pamela Susan Robson, Human Resources Business Partner, Government Office for the South West, Department for Education and Skills.
- William Ross, Highland Councillor. For services to Forestry in the Highlands.
- Professor David Michael Rowe, Professor of Thermoelectrics, Cardiff University. For services to Technology.
- John Michael Salisbury, lately Executive Producer, BBC Natural History Unit. For services to Broadcasting.
- Peter John Scales, lately Chief Executive, London Pensions Fund Authority. For services to Local Government.
- Annabella, Mrs. Scott. For services to Youth Justice.
- Linda, Mrs. Scott, National Manager, Arkwright Scholarships Trust. For services to Engineering and Technology Education.
- Paul Sergeant, Chief Executive, Wales Millennium Stadium. For services to Business.
- Dipesh Jayantilal Shah, lately Chief Executive OYcer, United Kingdom Atomic Energy Authority. For services to the Energy Industry.
- Rita, Mrs. Sharma, Founder and Managing Director, Best at Travel plc. For services to the Travel Industry.
- Ms Diana Winifred Shindler, Legal Adviser, Department for Transport.
- Kenneth Alan Shooter, lately Specialist Technology, Ofsted H.M. Inspectorate and Lead Adviser, Specialist Schools Programme, Department for Education and Skills.
- Professor Jonathan Richard Sibert, lately Paediatrician, Cardiff and Vale NHS Trust and lately Professor of Child Health, Cardiff University. For services to Paediatrics and to Child Health.
- Andrew Brian Simmons, Chief Executive, Hertfordshire Connexions Partnership. For services to Young People.
- Jasminder Singh, Founder and Chair, Radisson Edwardian Hotel Group. For services to the Hotel Industry.
- Tom Tar Singh, Founder and Non-Executive Director, New Look. For services to the Fashion Industry.
- Rodney Gerald Yorke Slatford, Founder and Chair, The Yorke Trust. For services to Music.
- Alan John Smith, Founder and Managing Partner, Red Box Design Group. For services to Architecture in the North East.
- Brian Anthony Frank Smith, D.L. For charitable services.
- Susan Ellen, Mrs. Smith, Deputy Chief Officer, Devon Fire and Rescue Service. For services to Fire Safety.
- Ms Irene Ruth Spellman, Chief Executive, Institution of Mechanical Engineers. For services to Workplace Learning.
- David Michael Cochrane Elsworth Steen, Commissioner, Gambling Commission. For services to the Gambling Industry.
- Stef Stefanou, Chair, John Doyle Group plc. For services to the Construction Industry.
- Ian Stephenson, Member, Advisory Committee on Business and the Environment. For services to the Environment.
- Neil Stewart, lately Head of Energy Policy, Scottish Executive.
- Robert Andrew Stiby, J.P., lately Chair, Tindle Radio Ltd. For services to Broadcasting.
- Gary Steven Stockbridge, Team Leader, Traffic Information and Customer Services, Highways Agency, Department for Transport.
- Harry Thomas Stratford, Chair, ProStrakan. For services to Life Sciences in Scotland.
- Dr. Geraldine Mary Strathdee, Consultant Psychiatrist and Clinical Director, Oxleas NHS Trust. For services to the NHS.
- Peter Charles Styche, lately Director, Spatial Planning and Housing, Government Office for the North West, Department for Communities and Local Government.
- Steven Norman Sumner, National Health and Safety Policy Adviser, Local Government Employers. For services to Local Government.
- Ms Moira Swinbank, Chief Executive, TimeBank. For services to Volunteering.
- Professor Ian Swingland, Founder, The Durrell Institute for Conservation and Ecology. For services to Conservation.
- Graham Francis Taylor, lately Headteacher, The Downs School, Newbury, Berkshire. For services to Education.
- Ms Edna Margaret Telfer, Director, Bristol Drugs Project. For services to People who Misuse Drugs.
- Joyce Anne, Mrs. Thacker, Senior Head of Service for Children and Young People, Rotherham Metropolitan Borough Council. For services to Young People.
- Robert Russell Thompson, Director of Fundraising, Royal British Legion. For services to Ex-Servicemen and Women.
- Duncan Gillies Thomson, lately Convenor, Loch Lomond and The Trossachs National Park Authority. For services to the Environment.
- Sarah Winifred, Mrs. Todd, Grade A, Northern Ireland Office.
- Martin John Devereux Traynor, Chief Executive, Leicestershire Chamber of Commerce. For services to Business and to the community in the East Midlands.
- Stephanie Linda, Mrs. Trotter, President, CO-Gas Safety and Vice-President, Consumer Safety International. For services to Health and Safety in the Gas Industry.
- Mohammed Tufail, Director, North Staffordshire Racial Equality Council. For services to Community Relations.
- Dr. Rowena Jane Tye, Team Leader, Ofwat).
- Adrian Underwood, lately National Director, Boarding Schools' Association. For services to Education.
- Rosemary Margaret, Mrs. Varley, lately Regional Commissioner, NHS Appointments Commission and Chair, General Optical Council. For services to the NHS and to Healthcare.
- Professor Richard Frank Verdi, Professor of Fine Art and Director, Barber Institute of Fine Arts, University of Birmingham. For services to Art and Art History.
- Adrian Vinken, Chair, Culture South West and Chief Executive, Theatre Royal, Plymouth. For services to the Arts.
- Professor Jeffrey King Waage, Professor of Applied Ecology, Imperial College London. For services to Science.
- Judith Ann, Mrs. Walker, Chief Crown Prosecutor, South Yorkshire Crown Prosecution Service.
- Councillor Alexander Watson, Leader, Derwentside District Council. For services to Local Government.
- Andrew White, B2, Ministry of Defence.
- John White, Head, Devolved Customer Relations, OGCbuying.solutions, H.M. Treasury.
- Robert Ernest Wilkins, Director of Transport and Environment, East Sussex County Council. For services to Local Government.
- Dr. Charlotte Francesca Williams. For services to Ethnic Minority Groups and to Equal Opportunities in Wales.
- David Huw Jones Williams, Assembly Lawyer, Legal Services Department.
- Roy Wilsher, Chief Fire Officer, Hertfordshire Fire and Rescue Service. For services to Fire Safety.
- Margaret, Mrs. Winchcombe, Health and Social Care Consultant. For services to disabled people.
- Ms Carol Wolstenholme, lately Leadership Development Manager, The Pension Service, Department for Work and Pensions.
- Miss Susan Elizabeth Wolstenholme, Director, British Tennis Foundation. For services to Disabled Sport.
- Ms Sarah Ann Wood, lately Director of Policy, Local Government Association. For services to Local Government.
- Guy Anthony Woolfenden, Composer and Conductor. For services to Music.
- Ian Harold Woosnam, M.B.E., Golfer. For services to Sport.
- Christopher Worthy, Grade B2, Ministry of Defence.

Diplomatic Service and Overseas List

- Colin Charles Adams. For services to the community, business and Caymanian heritage, Cayman Islands.
- Jeffrey Ames, First Secretary, Foreign and Commonwealth Office.
- George Edward Asseily. For services to British business interests in Lebanon and philanthropic activities in the UK.
- James Lloyd Baxendale, Counsellor, Foreign and Commonwealth Office.
- Derek Stuart Blackwood. For services to commerce and British interestS in the United States of America.
- Edmund Arthur Blennerhassett, M.B.E. For services to British interests in Panama.
- Ms Bridget Diana Brind, lately First Secretary, British Embassy Baghdad.
- Jonathan Hershl Cohen. For services to conflict prevention and resolution in the Caucasus.
- Eunice Campbell, Mrs. Crook, British Council Director, South India.
- Ms Pauline Ann Crowe, Chief Executive, Prisoners Abroad.
- Yousef Daneshvar. For services to British business interests in Iran.
- Ms Carol Doughty, Regional Director Visa Services, South Asia and the Middle East, British High Commission India.
- Christopher James Edge, lately First Secretary, Foreign and Commonwealth Office.
- Leslie William Edmonds, Q.F.S.M. For services to the community, Gibraltar.
- Dr. Helen Francesca Elloway. For medical services (Church Mission Society) in the Democratic Republic of Congo.
- Ms Deborah Joan Fisher, Deputy Head of Mission and Deputy Permanent Representative to the African Union, British Embassy, Addis Ababa.
- Professor Ian Thomas McVey Gow. For services to British education in East China.
- Dr. Lillian Craig Harris. For services to displaced people in Sudan and charitable activities in Cairo.
- Vincent Richard Harris. For services to British business interests in Pakistan.
- Andrew Magnus Kent, Counsellor, Foreign and Commonwealth Office.
- Chief William Denton Knight. For services to the development of sustainable community-led rural development programmes in Nigeria.
- Professor Christopher Brian Dyce Lavy. For services to orthopaedic care in Africa.
- Ms Christine Loh, Chief Executive, Civic Exchange, Hong Kong.
- Mark Seumas McCombe. For services to British business interests in Turkey and relief/recovery eVorts following the bombings in Istanbul in 2003.
- Professor Elizabeth Margaret Molyneux. For services to paediatric healthcare in Malawi.
- Professor Malcolm Edward Molyneux. For medical services in Malawi, particularly in the field of tropical diseases.
- Dr. Colin Harold Robertson Niven. For services to British education in China.
- John Payne, British Council Director, Ghana.
- Dr. Molly Elizabeth Pont. For services to medical healthcare in Quetta, Pakistan.
- Peter Alexander Rhodes. For services to British business interests in France.
- Dennis Sammut. For services to conflict prevention and resolution in the South Caucasus.
- Don Robert Scott. For services to British business interests and charitable works in Russia.
- Jonathan David Smith, C.P.M., lately Commissioner of Police, Bermuda Police Service.
- John Phillip Stops, lately Country Director, Voluntary Services Overseas (VSO), Thailand.
- Montague William Style. For services to British business interests in Switzerland.
- Ian Main Thomson. For services to environmentally-friendly fishing practices in the South Atlantic.
- Sanjay Mark Wadvani, lately Deputy Consul-General and Head of Trade and Investment, British Consulate-General, Guangzhou.
- Douglas Ian Wilson, lately First Secretary, British Embassy, Baghdad.
- Miss Sylvia Mary Wright, M.B.E. For services to disabled children in South India.

==== Member of the Order of the British Empire (MBE) ====
- Colin Festus Adams, Senior Executive Officer, Human Resources Equality and Diversity Team, Department for Education and Skills.
- Peter Henry Dredge Ainsworth. For services to the Scouts in Pinner, Middlesex.
- Colin Walter Aitken, Inspector, Ministry of Defence Police.
- James Noel Carrol Alder, Member, Morpeth Harriers Athletics Club. For services to Sport in the North East.
- Ms Dounne Alexander, Founder, Gramma's Herbal Foods. For services to the Food Industry.
- Euan Nicholas Allen. For services to the Suffolk Cathedral Millennium Project.
- Janet, Mrs. Allen. For services to the community in Scalford, Leicestershire.
- Thelma, Mrs. Allen, J.P., Employer Compliance Officer, H.M. Revenue and Customs.
- Raja Mohammed Amin, J.P., Chair, Balsall Heath Streetwatch. For services to the community in Birmingham.
- Miss Cheryl Anderson, Head of Administration, School of Engineering, Cranfield University. For services to Higher Education.
- Ronald Arkley Anderson. For services to NHS Catering and to the community in Walsall, West Midlands.
- William Ian Appleby. For services to Young People in Birmingham.
- David Iain Armstrong, Meteor Multinational Project Director, MBDA. For services to the Defence Industry.
- Margaret Bannerman, Mrs. Arnold. For services to the Soldiers', Sailors' and Airmen's Families Association in Moray, Nairn and Banffshire.
- Linda, Mrs. Arrowsmith, Ministerial Briefing Manager, Department of Health.
- Malcolm Ashbrook, Risk Manager, H.M. Revenue and Customs.
- Mohammad Aslam. For services to the community in Croydon.
- Dr. Kanyalal Aswani, General Medical Practitioner, Waltham Forest. For services to Healthcare.
- The Reverend Canon Patricia Anne Atkinson. For services to Street Children in South India.
- Valerie Ann, Mrs. Attenborough, J.P. For services to the community in Norfolk.
- Richard Avard, lately Mapping and Charting Officer, Highways Agency, Department for Transport.
- Linda, Mrs. Ayre, Registered Manager, Tow Law Children's Home, Durham. For services to Children.
- Paul Victor Bache. For services to the Meat Industry.
- John Sinclair Bailey, T.D. For services to the Church of England in Worcester.
- Miss Eileen Winifred Bairstow. For services to the Pembrokeshire Counselling Service.
- Maureen, Mrs. Baker, Headteacher, Children's House Nursery School, Edinburgh. For services to Early Years Education.
- Harold Bales, Lecturer, Gas Industry Training, New College, Nottingham. For services to Further Education and to Skills Training.
- Peter Brian Barlow, lately Principal Assistant, Zoology Department, University of Cambridge. For services to Higher Education.
- John Edward Barrett, lately Tennis Commentator, BBC. For services to Sports Broadcasting.
- Brian Barron, BBC Foreign Correspondent. For services to Broadcasting.
- Lieutenant Colonel Francis Charles Batten, D.L. For services to the Soldiers', Sailors' and Airmen's Families Association in Dyfed.
- Peter Beal, lately Northern Editor, Press Association. For services to Journalism.
- Celia, Mrs. Beaumont. For services to Humberside Probation Service and to the Scout Association.
- Barbara Mary, Mrs. Bell, lately Chair of Governors, Lady Adrian Special School, Cambridge. For services to Special Needs Education.
- George Bell, lately Milkman, Wiseman's Dairy. For services to the community in Gullane, East Lothian.
- Helen, Mrs. Bell. For charitable services in Scotland.
- Joseph Donald Benoist, lately Section Manager, En-Route Air Space, Civil Aviation Authority. For services to Civil Aviation.
- Anthony John Gilbert Berry, J.P., Chair and Co-Founder, North Staffordshire Heart Committee. For services to the community in North Staffordshire.
- Dr. Binoy Bhattacharyya, Consultant, West Middlesex Hospital. For services to Medicine.
- Marion, Mrs. Birch. For charitable services to Bradford Hospitals.
- Rosalind, Mrs. Birchall. For services to the British Red Cross Society in Scotland.
- Miss Rosemary Bird. For services providing rural experience on Dartmoor and in the South West for Inner City Young People.
- Edna May, Mrs. Bishop. For services to the Women's Royal Voluntary Service in Plymouth.
- Alan David Blair, Chief Executive, Wessex Heartbeat Charity. For charitable services in Hampshire.
- Marjorie Netta, Mrs. Blamey, Botanical Illustrator. For services to Art.
- Ms Susan Margaret Blane, Costume and Set Designer. For services to Drama.
- Dr. John Marcus Blatchly, former President, Suffolk Institute of Archaeology and History. For services to Heritage.
- Sandra, Mrs. Blockley, Founder, Lorraine Blockley Cancer Fund. For charitable services.
- David Philip Boulter, Consultant, Driver Safety Training. For services to Public Transport.
- Judith Margaret, Mrs. Bousfield. For services to the community in Keighley, West Yorkshire.
- Aubrey Francis Houston Bowden. For services to the Army Dress Committee.
- Richard Munden Bower, Recycling Education Officer, Cornwall County Council. For services to Local Government.
- Carol, Mrs. Bowes, Senior Officer, H.M. Revenue and Customs.
- David Charles Boyle. For charitable services in Northern Ireland.
- Nicolas Leighton Bracegirdle, Grade C1, Ministry of Defence.
- Kathleen Theresa, Mrs. Braddock. For services to the community in Rutland.
- James Coulter Bradley, lately Leading Seaman, Ministry of Defence.
- John Harold Bradley, Fleet Manager, Hampshire Constabulary. For services to the Police.
- Miss Jane Bratby. For services to H.M. Prison Armley, Leeds.
- Miss Elizabeth Margaret Braund. For services providing rural experience on Dartmoor and in the South West for Inner City Young People.
- John Anthony Hugh Bray, Chief Executive, The Bishop's Forum, Cornwall. For services to Young People.
- Michael Gerrard Martin Brennan, Head of Learning Development, Queen Mary University of London. For services to Higher Education.
- John Ernest Briggs, Actor. For services to Drama.
- Frances Grace, Mrs. Bristow. For services to Education and the community in Suffolk.
- Douglas Gordon Broadbent, Fundraiser, British Cardiac Patients' Association. For charitable services.
- Gill, Mrs. Bromley, Strategic Manager, Kent County Council Libraries and Archives. For services to Local Government.
- Cecil Edward Hilary Brooks. For services to the Royal British Legion in Hampshire.
- Dr. Janine Brooks, Associate Director for Dentistry, National Clinical Assessment Service. For services to Dentistry.
- Robert Michael Brooks, Administration Manager, Preston Crown Court, Her Majesty's Court Service, Department for Constitutional Affairs.
- Mary Jane, Mrs. Brown, Treasurer, Northern Ireland Farm and Country Holidays Association. For services to the Tourist and Hospitality Industries.
- Maureen Shirley, Mrs. Brown. For services to the community in Trumpington, Cambridge.
- Peter Charles Brown. For services to the community in Weasenham St. Peter, Norfolk.
- Elizabeth, Mrs. Bryson, Teacher, Euston Street Primary School, Belfast. For services to Education.
- Brian James Buck, Court Security Officer, Vale Royal Magistrates' Court, Department for Constitutional Affairs.
- Christopher Thomas Bullock, Chief Executive, Institute of Advanced Motorists. For services to Road Safety.
- Trevor George Burchick. For services to the community in Greater Manchester.
- Terrance John Burns. For services to the community in Gentleshaw, Staffordshire.
- Ms Eleri Butler. For services to Domestic Violence Against Women.
- John Joseph Buxton, D.L. For services to Conservation in Norfolk.
- Miss Marianne Caffrey, IT Systems Engineer, Particle Physics and Astronomy Research Council. For services to Science.
- Irene Helen, Mrs. Callaghan. For services to Nursing and to Charity in Angus.
- Christine Mary, Mrs. Callund, Founder, Charitable Association Supplying Hospitals. For charitable services in East Berkshire.
- Peter Colin Carlsson, Founder, Young People's Forum, Waddington, Lincolnshire. For services to Young People.
- Andrew Joseph Carman. For services to disabled people in Warrington, Cheshire.
- Robin James Carr, Grade C1, Ministry of Defence.
- Wilhelmina, Mrs. Carson, Chair, Royal Ulster Constabulary George Cross Widow's Association. For services to the Police.
- Barbara Vivien, Mrs. Carter, J.P., D.L. For services to the Administration of Justice and to the community in Rochdale, Lancashire
- Kevin Cawood, lately Deputy Managing Director, VT Communications. For services to the Ministry of Defence.
- Peter Robin Chambers. For services to Disadvantaged Children in Somerset.
- John Frederick Chatburn. For services to the community in Hutton, Somerset.
- Myrna Edna, Mrs. Chave. For services to the Guide Dogs for the Blind Association and to the community in Poole, Dorset.
- Gladys, Mrs. Chilton. For services to the community in Sunderland, Tyne and Wear.
- Piara Singh Clair. For services to the community in Leicester.
- James Clarke, lately Legal Adviser, Perimeter Issues, Financial Services Authority. For services to the Financial Services Industry.
- Stephen Frank Clarke, Non-Executive Director, Accent Group Ltd. For services to the Financial Services Industry in Yorkshire and Humberside.
- Joyce, Mrs. Clement. For services to Oxfam in Formby, Liverpool.
- Jeffrey Brian Clements, Designer and Conservator. For services to Bookbinding.
- Robert Coles, Chair, Little Harrowden Parish Council. For services to the community in Northamptonshire.
- Michael Collier, Fishing Vessel Surveyor, Maritime and Coastguard Agency, Department for Transport.
- Ms Shirley Collins, Folk Singer and Writer. For services to Music.
- Pamela Mary, Mrs. Comber. For services to Mental Health in Folkestone, Kent.
- Andrew Bruce Compton. For services to the community in Stafford.
- George Patrick Constable, lately Grade C1, Ministry of Defence.
- Anthea, Mrs. Cooper, Teacher, Collis Primary School, Teddington, Middlesex. For services to Education.
- Charles Geoffrey Corkish. For services to the community in the Isle of Man.
- Anthony Cosgrove, Grade D, Ministry of Defence.
- Ms Julia Couchman, Grade E1, Ministry of Defence.
- Philip James Couchman, lately Manager, Chichester Harbour Area of Outstanding Natural Beauty. For services to Conservation.
- Robert David Cranna. For services to Norfolk Probation Service.
- Gerda Anneliese, Mrs. Craven. For services to the community in Chorleywood, Hertfordshire.
- John Crosby, Foster Carer. For services to Children and Families in Rhondda Cynon Taf.
- Joy, Mrs. Crosby, Foster Carer. For services to Children and Families in Rhondda Cynon Taf.
- John Clifford Culine. For services to the Showmen's Guild of Great Britain and to the community in Spennymoor, County Durham.
- Ms Cheryl Helen Maureen Cunningham, Secretary, University of Ulster, Coleraine. For services to Higher Education in Northern Ireland.
- Deirdre Aline Michelle, Mrs. Curtis. For services to the community in Toddington, Bedfordshire.
- Raymond Henry Daniel Curtis, Foundation Governor, Ampney Crucis Primary School, Gloucestershire. For services to Education.
- Joyce, Mrs. Dakin. For services to Victim Support, Leicestershire.
- David Godfrey Dallimore, Senior Messenger, Estates Management Group, Driver and Vehicle Licensing Agency, Department for Transport.
- Professor Amirtham Jebamoney David, Director of Nursing and Professional Development, West Kent Primary Care Trust. For services to the NHS.
- Violet, Mrs. Davidson, Administrative Officer, Department of Education, Northern Ireland Executive.
- Dr. David Hedydd Davies. For services to Welsh Athletics, in particular Carmarthen Harriers Athletics Club.
- Dr. Ivor Davies. For services to the Visual Arts.
- Pauleen, Mrs. Davies, J.P., President, Radford Care Group. For services to Older People in Nottingham.
- Peter Walters Davies. For services to Red Kite Conservation in Wales.
- Robert Hugh Thomas Davies, Solicitor. For services to the Legal Profession and to the community in South East Wales.
- Miss Pauline Davis, lately Switchboard Manager, National Assembly for Wales.
- Peter Edward Davis. For services to Red Kite Conservation in Wales.
- Rheta, Mrs. Davison, Chair, Cutsyke Community Group. For services to Young People in Castleford, West Yorkshire.
- Dr. William Donald Davison. For services to Music in Northern Ireland.
- Roger Davy, J.P. For services to the community in West Yorkshire.
- Wendy May, Mrs. Deakin, Bursar, Cledford Junior School, Middlewich, Cheshire. For services to Education.
- Alistair James Dent. For services to the community in Hilgay, Norfolk.
- Ms Morag Deyes, Artistic Director, Dance Base. For services to Dance in Scotland.
- Gurdarshan, Mrs. Dhanjal. For services to Community Relations in Bristol, in particular to South Asian families with disabled children.
- Professor Soraya Dhillon, Chair, Luton and Dunstable Hospital NHS Trust. For services to Healthcare.
- Jean Smith, Mrs. Dixon. For services to disabled people in Easington, County Durham.
- Sonia, Mrs. Dixon, African and Caribbean Services Manager, Walsall Libraries. For services to Local Government in the West Midlands.
- Norah Alice, Mrs. Dobinson, lately Trainbearer to the Lord Chancellor, Department for Constitutional Affairs.
- Brian Dougherty, Co-ordinator, Tullyally and District Development Group. For services to the community in Northern Ireland.
- Jessie, Mrs. Doull. For services to the community in Wick, Caithness.
- William Hugh Alexander Duncan, J.P., College Secretary and Clerk to the Board of Management, Moray College. For services to Further Education in the Highlands.
- Susan Elizabeth, Mrs. Dungey. For services to the Chaplaincy Team, Lister Hospital, Hertfordshire.
- Dr. Euan Kennedy Dunn. For services to Marine Conservation.
- Peter George Dunstan. For services to the Far Eastern Prisoners of War Association and Far East War Grave Archives.
- Ruth Durrell, Administrator, Research Methods Programme, Economic and Social Research Council. For services to Social Science.
- Cynthia, Mrs. Dyke. For services to Community Safety in Taffs Well, Rhondda Cynon Taf.
- Carl Robert Eddy, Administrative Assistant, H.M. Revenue and Customs.
- Ms Diana Edmonds, Head, Haringey Libraries, Archives and Museum Service. For services to Local Government in North London.
- George Tait Edwards, lately Senior Regional Property Adviser, Learning and Skills Council. For services to Further Education.
- Colonel Samuel Mervyn Elder, T.D., J.P., D.L. For services to the Reserve Forces and Cadets' Association in Northern Ireland.
- Alan Thomas Elliott, Founder and Director, Forest Fitness Centre. For services to Sport and voluntary community work in the Forest of Dean.
- William Elliott, Chair, Mitford Parish Council. For services to the community in Northumberland.
- Gordon Ellis, Area Business Manager, Scottish Executive.
- John Anthony Ellis, Head, Technology Exploitation Division, Space Department, Rutherford Appleton Laboratory. For services to Science.
- Stella, Lady Empey. For services to the community in Northern Ireland.
- Jerome Roy Evans, Manager, H.M. Young Offenders' Institution Thorn Cross, Warrington, Cheshire.
- Judith Marion, Mrs. Evans, Leader, St. Ives District Rangers, Cambridgeshire. For services to Young People.
- Olive Gwendoline, Mrs. Evans. For services to Education and to the community in Monmouthshire.
- Sue Prudence Anne, Mrs. Evans, District Nurse. For services to Healthcare and to the community in Burwell, Cambridgeshire.
- Susan, Mrs. Bowes-Evans, Chief Commandant, South Wales Police. For services to the Special Constabulary.
- John Wallace Kerr Ewart, General Manager, Blackburn Local Employment Scheme. For services to Young People and to the community in West Lothian.
- Hilary Joan, Mrs. Farley, lately Headteacher, Gladstone Primary School, Barry. For services to Education in Wales.
- Glynis Mary, Mrs. Farrell, Specialist Music Teacher, Holwell Primary School, Hertfordshire. For services to Education.
- Anne Mary, Mrs. Faulconer, J.P. For services to The Children's Society.
- Angela Nancy, Mrs. Faulding, Specialist Health Visitor, North East Lincolnshire Primary Care Trust. For services to Healthcare.
- Elaine, Mrs. Ferguson, Founder, Spark-Space and Right to Write Ltd. For services to People with Dyslexia.
- Olive Marion, Mrs. Ferguson. For services to Oxfam in Morningside, Edinburgh.
- Florence Arlene, Mrs. Ferry. For public service.
- Ms Linda Jean Finnamore, Prison Officer, H.M. Prison and Young Offenders' Institution New Hall, Wakefield, West Yorkshire.
- Councillor Barry Fippard, Councillor, Lincolnshire County Council. For services to Local Government in Lincolnshire.
- Paul Roland Firman. For services to the community in Martlesham Heath, Suffolk.
- Archie Macdonald Fisher, Singer and Songwriter. For services to Traditional Scottish Music.
- Leigh, Mrs. Flaherty, Higher Executive Officer, Human Resources Operations, Home Office.
- Miss Minerva Millicent Fletcher, Personal Secretary, Government Office for the West Midlands, Department of Trade and Industry.
- Paul John Fletcher. For services to Sport and to Charity.
- Brian Douglas Flood, Q.P.M. For services to the Police.
- Dr. Michael Wilfred Flowers. For charitable services in Yorkshire and Bangladesh.
- Elizabeth Marlene, Mrs. Forbes, Captain, 1st Northern Ireland Company, Girls' Brigade. For services to Young People.
- Dr. Fiona Mary Ford, General Medical Practitioner and Senior Lecturer, East Lancashire Teaching Primary Care Trust. For services to Healthcare.
- Sue Joan Frances, Mrs. Grayson Ford, Director, Campaign for Drawing. For services to Art.
- Peter Bernard Forsdick, Manager, Distribution Services Management, London Underground. For services to Public Transport.
- Helen, Mrs. Foster, Founder, Saturday Club for Deaf Children, Isle of Wight. For services to disabled children.
- Marian, Mrs. Fraser, Executive Officer, Jobcentre Plus, Department for Work and Pensions.
- Patricia, Mrs. Fry, Head of Education, Training and Careers, Particle Physics and Astronomy Research Council. For services to Science.
- Graham Richard John Fryer, Chairman, Driving Instructors' Association. For services to Road Safety.
- Robert John Fyffe. For services to the community in Northern Ireland.
- Anne, Mrs. Gait. For services to disabled children in Leeds.
- Richard Galliford. For services to the Youth of Barnsley and Overseas.
- Anne, Mrs. Gandy. For services to the community in Walton, Liverpool.
- John Edward Gardner, Events Planning Manager, London Buses. For services to Public Transport.
- Georgina Mary, Mrs. Gaskin. For services to the community in Northamptonshire.
- Martin John Gebbett, Executive Officer, Environmental Policy Officer, Government Office for Yorkshire and the Humber, Department for Communities and Local Government.
- Daphne, Mrs. Geer, President, Southern Counties Amateur Swimming Association. For services to Sport.
- Michael Geer, Swimming Coach and President, Royal Tunbridge Wells Monson Swimming Club. For services to Sport.
- Stephen Paul Gelder, Managing Director, Gelder Ltd., Gainsborough. For services to Business and to the community in Lincolnshire.
- Steven George Gerrard, Footballer. For services to Sport.
- Dr. Carol Gibbens. For services to the community in Dorset.
- Lambert Gibbons, Driver, Government Car and Despatch Agency, H.M. Treasury.
- Mary Dorothy Beckford, Mrs. Gibson. For services to the Bomber Command Association.
- Miss Rita Rose Gibson. For services to the community in West Bromwich, West Midlands.
- Ms Angela Jayne Gidden, Design Director and Founder, Attic 2 Ltd and Director and Co-Founder, Nomad and Nest Ltd. For services to Business in South Wales. *Barry Thomas Gifford, Director, Finance and Administration, Royal National Institute for the Blind. For services to People with Visual Impairment.
- Evelyn Mary, Mrs. Gittens, lately School Crossing Warden, Halton Borough Council, Cheshire. For services to Education.
- Tibor Gold, Patent and Trade Mark Attorney. For services to Intellectual Property.
- June, Mrs. Goodchild. For services to the community in Easterside, Middlesbrough.
- Patricia, Mrs. Gordon, Officer, National Insurance Contributions Office, H.M. Revenue and Customs.
- Stephen Grainger, Chief Executive, Youth Sport Trust. For services to School Sport.
- Ivor John Frederick Gray, Youth Football Coach. For services to Sport in Northumberland.
- William Grayson. For services to the community in Huddersfield.
- Hazel, Mrs. Green. For services to the Welfare of Prisoners in Wakefield.
- Barbara, Mrs. Greggains, Lay Representative, Clinical Radiology Patients Liaison Group, Royal College of Radiologists. For services to Healthcare.
- John William Grey, Head Shoe Shiner, Virgin Atlantic. For services to Passengers.
- Bernadette Philomena, Mrs. Grimes. For services to the Soldiers', Sailors' and Airmen's Families Association in the East Riding of Yorkshire.
- Wing Commander Peter Ernest Guiver. For services to the Air Training Corps, London and South East Region.
- Brian Guttridge, Naval Tailor. For services to the Armed Forces.
- Elizabeth Ann, Mrs. Haddow, Co-Founder, National Holiday Fund. For services to children and Families.
- Malcolm Haddow, Director and Trustee, National Holiday Fund. For services to Children and Families.
- Roberta, Mrs. Haffey. For services to the Church of Ireland.
- Thomas John Hall, Charge Nurse, Tyrone and Fermanagh Hospital. For services to Healthcare in Northern Ireland.
- Ms Ruby Hammer, Co-Founder, Ruby and Millie Cosmetics. For services to the Cosmetics Industry.
- Albert Hampson, lately Business Manager, AA Hotel Services. For services to the Hospitality Industry.
- Dilys Elvena, Mrs. Hanmer, President, Pembroke and District Committee, Macmillan Cancer Relief. For charitable services.
- Mary Terese, Mrs. Hanna, Mid-day Supervisor, St. James's Roman Catholic Primary School, Twickenham, London. For services to Education.
- Roy Hanna, Founder and Member, Aghalee Development Association. For services to the Rural Community in Northern Ireland.
- Derek Graham Hardwell, Senior Manager, Child Support Agency, Department for Work and Pensions.
- Joseph Kenneth Hargreaves. For services to the community in Lancashire.
- Thomas George Harland. For services to the British Standards Institution.
- Ann Marilyn, Mrs. Harries, J.P., D.L. For services to the Cub Scouts in Neath Port Talbot and Swansea.
- Francis Andrew Harrington, Member, Castle Morpeth Borough Council, Northumberland. For services to Local Government.
- Bill Harris, Chair and Member, Senior Citizen Forum, Shrewsbury. For services to the community in Shropshire.
- Philip Arthur Harris, Assistant Director of Community Services (Housing Operations), Plymouth City Council. For services to Local Government.
- Miss Ruth Alison Harte (Mrs. Langrish). For services to Music.
- Ms Angela Hartnett, Executive Chef, Connaught Hotel and Restaurant Proprietor. For services to the Hospitality Industry.
- Colin Walter Hassall, Drug and Alcohol Team Manager. For services to People who Misuse Drugs.
- Richard John Hatton, Boxer. For services to Sport.
- Rosemary, Mrs. Hawley, J.P., D.L., Chair, Knowsley Primary Care Trust. For services to Healthcare in Merseyside.
- Rosemary, Mrs. Hayes, lately Grade E1, Ministry of Defence.
- Ms Margaret Hazell. For services to the Trade Union Movement in Wales.
- Aneurin John Wyn Heath, Paramedic Supervisor, Wales Air Ambulance Service, Swansea. For services to Healthcare.
- Brenda Chamberlin, Mrs. Heesom. For services to the Sea Cadet Corps in Gravesend, Kent.
- Ms Phiona Jane Hesketh, Probation Officer, H.M. Prison, Kirkham, Lancashire. For services to Diversity.
- Gaye Stanford, Mrs. Hessay, Defence Section Translator, British Embassy, Madrid, Ministry of Defence.
- David Edward Highley, lately Minerals Geologist. For services to Science.
- Harry David Higman, Curator, National Cycle Museum Trust, Llandrindod Wells. For services to the Tourist Industry in Wales.
- Margaret, Mrs. Bradbury-Hiles, Chair, Friends of Whitchurch Community Hospital. For services to the community in Shropshire.
- Dr. Rowan Hillson, Consultant Physician and Diabetologist, The Hillingdon Hospital, Middlesex. For services to Medicine.
- Ann Christine, Mrs. Hilton, Teacher, Dame Janet Community Junior School, Ramsgate, Kent. For services to Education.
- Penelope Ann, Mrs. Hilton, Learning Facilitator, H.M. Revenue and Customs.
- Gregory Hinds, Chair of Governors, St. Alban's Roman Catholic High School Pontypool, Torfaen. For services to Education.
- Jillian Isla, Mrs. Hinds. For services to the community in Kelvedon, Essex.
- Ronald Michael Hitchens, Teacher, Roskear School, Camborne, Cornwall. For services to Education.
- Jennifer Ann, Mrs. Hocking, Associate Dean, Warwick Business School. For services to Higher Education.
- Mary, Mrs. Hodgson. For services to disabled people in Croydon, Surrey.
- Malcolm Joseph Holmes, Senior Archivist, Camden Library. For services to Local Government.
- Colin Peter Honey. For charitable services.
- Nicholas Peter Hopkinson. For services to Bolton Lads' and Girls' Club and to young people in Bolton.
- Kenneth Hopley, lately Area Manager, Vehicle and Operator Services Agency, Department of Transport.
- Sally, Mrs. Hopson, Retail Managing Director, East Division, Asda Stores. For services to Diversity.
- Dr. William Donald Hoskins. For services to Music in East London.
- Michael Huber, Grade C1, Ministry of Defence.
- Hugh George Hughes. For services to the Sheep Industry in Wales.
- Councillor Joseph Clifford Hughes. For services to St. Catherine's Hospice and to the community in South Ribble, Lancashire.
- Miss Margaret Anne Hughes. For services to the League of Friends, Oxford Churchill Hospital.
- Kay, Mrs. Hurwitz, Violin and Viola Teacher. For services to Music.
- Misbah Sultana, Mrs. Hussain. For services to Asian communities in South Yorkshire.
- Margaret, Mrs. Hutchins, Nursing Sister, Bellsdyke Hospital, Larbert. For services to Mental Health Nursing in Stirling.
- Patricia Jean, Mrs. Hutchison, Senior Officer, Child Trust Fund Office, H.M. Revenue and Customs.
- Vera Margaret Pamela, Mrs. Ide. For services to the Women's Royal Voluntary Service in Reading.
- Roger Mason Ingham. For services to Sport in North Yorkshire.
- Lieutenant Colonel Thomas Irlam. For services to the Soldiers', Sailors' and Airmen's Families Association in Sussex.
- Shelagh Dickson, Mrs. Iwanowicz, Human Resources Manager, H.M. Revenue and Customs.
- Edward Ewart Jackson, Chair, Royal Society of Wildlife Trusts and Chair, Lancashire Wildlife Trust. For services to Conservation.
- Elizabeth Joan, Mrs. Jackson, Founder, Great Guns Marketing. For services to Business.
- Mary Elizabeth, Mrs. Jackson, Supply Teacher, Shanklin Church of England Primary School, Isle of Wight. For services to Education.
- Victoria Irene, Mrs. Jackson, Director, Kingston Recruitment Ltd. For services to Business and to the community in Kingston-upon-Hull.
- Evelyn, Lady Jacomb, Chair, Friends of Moorfields Hospital. For charitable services in London.
- Ms Darryl Jaffray, lately Director of Education and Access, Royal Opera House. For services to Dance.
- Peter Thomas John Jefferis. For services to the community in the West Midlands.
- Joanna, Mrs. Jenkins, J.P. For services to the Independent Monitoring Board, H.M. Prison Parc, Bridgend, and to the National Council.
- Edwin Gordon Jenner, Council Member, Natural Environment Research Council. For services to Environmental Science.
- Enid Lois, Mrs. Johns. For services to the Multiple Sclerosis Society and to the community in Helston, Cornwall.
- John Duncan Johnston, lately Harbour Master, Eyemouth. For services to the community in Berwickshire.
- Doris May, Mrs. Jones. For services to People with Learning Disabilities and to the community in Anglesey.
- Elizabeth, Mrs. Jones. For services to Education and to the community in Flintshire.
- Professor Emeritus Gareth Elwyn Jones. For services to Education in Wales.
- The Reverend Robert Lynton Jones, University Chaplain, Roehampton University. For services to Higher Education.
- Dr. William Richard Bevan Jones. For services to the community in Sawston, Cambridge.
- David Anthony Welton Joy. For services to the Environment in the North East.
- Thomas Joyce. For services to the community in Doncaster, South Yorkshire.
- Beryl Genevieve, Mrs. Juma, Clinical Lead, Leeds Sickle Cell and Thalassaemia Service. For services to Healthcare.
- Syed Kifayat Hussain Kazmi. For services to the community in Derby.
- Richard Alan Keeves, Senior Valuer, Valuation Office Agency, H.M. Revenue and Customs.
- Kenneth Kelley, Bandmaster, Burghclere Primary School Brass Band, Berkshire. For services to Music Education.
- Ms Millie Kendall, Co-Founder, Ruby and Millie Cosmetics. For services to the Cosmetic Industry.
- Lewis Thomas Kent, Honorary Treasurer, Oakley Holidays for Young People. For services to Young People.
- Alexander John King, Deputy Leader, Kent County Council. For services to Local Government.
- Ernest Charles King, Member, London Travelwatch. For services to Public Transport.
- Margaret Susanna, Mrs. Knott. For services to the community in Northern Ireland and to Children Overseas.
- Dr. Bernard Knowles. For services to the community in West Yorkshire.
- Kim Robert Knowles, Executive Director, Midlands Fashion Showcase. For services to the Fashion Industry.
- John Hugh Knox. For public service.
- Anil Krishnarao Koshti, Nuclear Regulator, Environment Agency. For services to the Environment.
- Julia, Mrs. Kury, Executive Officer, Jobcentre Plus, Department for Work and Pensions.
- Ronald Lamb. For services to the community in Durham.
- Peter William Lambley, lately Conservation Officer, English Nature. For services to Conservation in Norfolk.
- John Henry Lander, Senior Leading Hand Air Frame Fitter, Marshall Aerospace. For services to the Aerospace Industry.
- Joseph Charles Lansdell, Foster Carer, West Sussex. For services to Children and Families.
- Rita Eileen, Mrs. Lansdell, Foster Carer, West Sussex. For services to Children and Families.
- Ivor Lask, lately Optometrist, Bromley Hospitals NHS Trust. For services to the NHS.
- Ronald Anthony Lass, Chair, Cocoa Research Committee. For services to the Food Industry.
- Susan, Mrs. Law, Head of Library Service. For services to Local Government in East Lancashire.
- Carl Rex Owen Lawrence. For services to Victim Support in Leicestershire and Rutland.
- Derek Charles Lawson. For public service and to the community in Higham Ferrers, Northamptonshire.
- Sarah Elizabeth, Mrs. Lee, J.P., D.L., lately High Sheriff of South Yorkshire. For services to the Administration of Justice.
- John Leese. For services to the Douglas Macmillan Hospice, Stoke-on-Trent.
- John Eugene Lenney (Junior). For services to Music and to Young People in Cardiff.
- Ann Elizabeth, Mrs. Lewis, Councillor, Holyhead Town Council. For services to the community in Holyhead, Anglesey.
- Heather, Mrs. Lewis, Food, Health and Safety Manager, Rhondda Cynon Taff. For services to Local Government.
- Dr. Alan William Lillington, D.L. For services to the community in Sunderland, Tyne and Wear.
- William Arthur Lindop. For services to the community in The Gambia.
- John Joseph Linehan. For charitable services in Northern Ireland.
- John William Littlechild, J.P. For services to the community in South Wales.
- Jane Helen Violet, Lady Lloyd of Berwick, D.L., Chair, Family Welfare Association. For charitable services.
- Sallie Loretta, Mrs. Lockwood. For services to the community in Carlton, North Yorkshire.
- Rajyasree, Mrs. Lodh, lately Administrative Officer, Child Support Agency, Department for Work and Pensions.
- Dr. Iftikhar Ahmed Lone, J.P., General Medical Practitioner, Middlesbrough. For services to Healthcare.
- Ms Jeanette Anne Longfield. For services to Food Policy Issues.
- Miss Mary Grace Longsdon. For services to the Fell Pony Society.
- Gillian Lesley, Mrs. Lowndes. For services to the Duke of Edinburgh Award Scheme, Ysgol Bryn Elian, Colwyn Bay, Conwy.
- Peter Gradwell Lund. For services to the community in Oxfordshire.
- Lynn Avis, Mrs. Lynch, Consultant Midwife, North Glamorgan NHS Trust. For services to Healthcare.
- Thomas Lynch. For services to Bicycle Moto Cross (BMX) Racing and to Ambulance Service Cycling.
- Ms Mary Geraldine Lyons, Chief Executive and Director, Springvale Training Ltd. For services to the community in Northern Ireland.
- Ronald John MacAuley. For public service.
- James William Ian Macdonald, J.P. For services to the Administration of Justice in Salford.
- William Keith MacGillivray, Assistant Chief Officer, Strathclyde Fire and Rescue. For services to the Fire Service National Benevolent Fund.
- Norma Ann, Mrs. MacLellan, lately Clerical Assistant and Typist, Caol Primary School, Fort William. For services to Education and to the community in Inverness-shire.
- Ruby Irene Dorothy, Mrs. Mallinson. For services to the Women's Auxiliary Air Force Association.
- Patricia, Mrs. Mancini. For charitable services in Blackpool, Lancashire.
- Angelo Manorajah, Financial Director, Fairbridge. For services to Disadvantaged Young People.
- Neale Charles Marney, Supervisor, Newbury Ambulance Station. For services to the NHS.
- Robert Norwood Marris. For services to the RAF Association in Hertfordshire.
- Harry Marsh, Board Member, Children and Families Court Advisory and Support Service and Vice-Chair, National Children's Bureau. For services to Children and Families.
- Alexander Marshall. For services to Bowls.
- Dr. Elizabeth Carole Martin, lately Director of Public Health and Medical Director, Kingston Primary Care Trust. For services to Medicine.
- Peter Duncan Arthur Marwood, Chair, Nottingham and Nottinghamshire Leukaemia Research Fund. For charitable services.
- Mary, Mrs. Mathie. For services to Foster Care in Scotland.
- Arthur Mathieson, Customer Services Manager, Standard Life. For services to the community in Leith, Edinburgh.
- Commander Barry John Mattey, Royal Navy. For services to the Sea Cadet Corps.
- Peter Charles Maudlin. For services to the community in Upper Caldecote, Bedfordshire.
- David Maughan. For services to Farming in County Durham.
- Councillor Walter McAdam, D.L., Councillor, Clackmannanshire Council. For services to Local Government.
- Wesley John McCabe. For services to the Communication Industry.
- Joan Heather, Mrs. McClelland, University Governor and lately Principal, Castlewellan Primary School. For services to Education in Northern Ireland.
- Anthony Maurice McDermott, Leader, Halton Borough Council. For services to Local Government in Cheshire.
- John Patrick McDowall, Commander, Counter-Terrorism Command, Specialist Operations, Metropolitan Police Service. For services to the Police.
- Maureen, Mrs. McEvoy. For services to the Adoption of Children in Scotland.
- Miss Margaret Mary Bridget McEwen. For services to Children Overseas.
- Alison, Mrs. McFaul, RSPB Information Warden, Rathlin Island, County Antrim. For services to the Environment in Northern Ireland.
- George McGrattan, Principal Teacher of Computing, Garnock Academy, North Ayrshire. For services to Education.
- Kevin McKillop, Accommodation Officer, Driver and Vehicle Licensing Northern Ireland, Department of the Environment, Northern Ireland Executive.
- Alan McKinney, lately Chief Executive, Scottish Stone Liaison Group. For services to the Stonemason Industry in Scotland.
- Sheila Elizabeth Isobel, Mrs. McLaughlin. For services to Music in Northern Ireland.
- Pamela, Mrs. McLean, Administrative Officer, Child Support Agency, Department for Work and Pensions.
- Ida, Mrs. McMaster. For services to Archaeology in Essex.
- Yvonne, Mrs. McQuinn, J.P., Non-Executive Director, former North Kirklees Primary Care Trust. For services to the NHS.
- Major Robert Harold Medley, D.L. For services to Ex-Servicemen and Women in Wales.
- Jayne Denise, Mrs. Medlicott, Nursing Director, Hospice of the Valleys, Blaenau Gwent. For services to Healthcare.
- Malcolm Coubrough Meikle, Member, Wychavon District Council, Fladbury Ward. For services to Local Government.
- Dr. Althea Melling, Head of the Centre for Volunteering and Community Action, University of Central Lancashire. For services to Higher Education.
- James Duncan Alan Michael. For services to Visually Impaired and Disadvantaged People in the Highlands.
- Violet, Mrs. Miles. For services to the community in Milton-under-Wychwood, Oxfordshire.
- David St. John Nasmyth-Miller, Inspector, Metropolitan Police Service. For services to the Police.
- Kenneth Angus Milroy, Chief Executive, Aberdeen Foyer. For services to Disadvantaged People in Scotland.
- Christopher David Minty, Special Projects Officer, Belize, Royal Botanic Garden, Edinburgh. For services to the Conservation of the Central American Rainforest.
- Ann, Mrs. Mitchell, lately Customer Services Assistant, Refectory, Lauder College. For services to Further Education in Dunfermline.
- Elizabeth, Mrs. Mitchell, District Nurse, Dunfermline and West Fife Community Health Partnership. For services to Healthcare.
- Lynn Mittell, Radio Presenter and Comedy Music Performer. For services to Entertainment in Wales.
- James Andrew Moar, Retained Station Officer, Highlands and Islands Fire and Rescue Service. For services to Fire Safety.
- Anthony Mooney, lately Administrative Officer, Jobcentre Plus, Department for Work and Pensions.
- Phillip Edward Stephen Morgan, Director, Support Services, Bedford Hospital NHS Trust. For services to the NHS.
- Susan, Mrs. Morgan, Macmillan Nurse Specialist for Teenagers and Young Adults, St. James's University Hospital, Leeds. For services to the NHS.
- Terrig Goronwy Morgan, lately Chair, National Farmers' Union Milk Committee. For services to the Dairy Industry.
- John Keith Mortin, lately Manager, H.M. Prison Manchester, H.M. Prison Service.
- Betty, Mrs. Morton. For services to the British Red Cross Society in Lincolnshire.
- Moses, Trustee, Brent Community Transport. For services to the community in North London.
- David Rhodri Mugridge, Inspector, Metropolitan Police Service. For services to the Police.
- Christine, Mrs. Mullen, Associate Director, Workforce Strategy NHS North West. For services to the NHS.
- Miss Sandra Mullin. For services to the community in Earlesfield Estate, Grantham, Lincolnshire.
- Councillor Ronald Munby. For services to the community in Keswick, Cumbria.
- Susan Mrs. Murrell. For services to the Civil Service Benevolent Fund, Home Office.
- Miss Eileen Myers, Executive Officer, Health and Safety Executive, Department for Work and Pensions.
- Dr. Frank Edward Neal, Chair, Rotherham Hospice Trust. For services to Healthcare.
- Brian Needham. For services to the Duke of Edinburgh Award and to Young People.
- Ronald Beattie Neill. For public service.
- Miss Hazel Catherine Newberry. For services to Ballroom Dancing.
- Jean Diana, Mrs. Newman. For services to the community in South Somerset.
- Lilian, Mrs. Newman, lately Chair, Inverclyde Tourist Group. For services to the Tourist Industry in Scotland.
- Roger Edward Newman. For charitable services.
- Dr. Jennifer Margaret Newton. For services to Conservation in North Lancashire.
- Andrew James Nisbet, Works Manager, Historic Scotland, Scottish Executive.
- Kathleen, Mrs. Nisbet, Councillor, Blyth Valley District Council. For services to Local Government in Blyth, Northumberland.
- Peter Noot, Woodland Officer, West Sussex, Forestry Commission.
- David Norman, Retained Sub-Officer, Gloucestershire Fire and Rescue Service. For services to Fire Safety.
- Yvonne Mary, Mrs. Norton, Chair, West Midlands Lupus Group. For services to Healthcare.
- Daniel Terrence O'Connell. For services to Youth Justice and to the community in Cumbria.
- Carmen Winifred, Mrs. O'Hagan, Teacher, Northern Ireland Prison Service.
- John O'Leary, Councillor, Staffordshire County Council. For services to Local Government.
- Audrey, Mrs. O'Neill. For services to the Sport of Baton Twirling.
- Miss Linda Joyce Oakley, Director, Ideas21. For services to Invention and Innovation.
- Peter William Ogles. For services to the Royal Mail and to St. John Ambulance Brigade in Chipping Norton, Oxfordshire.
- Jean, Mrs. Oliver, Vice-Chair, Parkfield and Mill Lane Neighbourhood Management Pathfinder Board. For services to the community in Stockton-on-Tees.
- Peter James Stephen Olney. For services to Zoos and to Conservation.
- Comfort, Mrs. Omoko, Senior Catering Manager, Metropolitan Police Service. For services to the Police.
- Mary, Mrs. Ord. For services to the Huntly and District Macmillan Cancer Research Branch, Aberdeen.
- Keith Stuart Osborn, lately Chief Scientist, United Utilities plc. For services to Business and to Public Health.
- Ronald Frederick Osborn, lately Director, Osborn and Simmons Ltd. For services to Surgical Instruments Manufacture.
- Jean Ellen, Mrs. Outhwaite. For services to the Cub Scouts in Lancashire and Cheshire.
- Bridget Carlile, Mrs. Overton, lately Manager, Maidstone Volunteer Bureau. For services to the community in Kent.
- Theresa Josephine, Mrs. Owen, Volunteer Services Manager, Aintree University Hospitals NHS Foundation Trust. For services to the NHS in Merseyside.
- William Robert Palmer, T.D., Corporation Tax Manager, H.M. Revenue and Customs.
- Charles Edgar Park. For services to Raptor Conservation in South West Scotland.
- George Parker. For services to the community in Barford St. Michael, Oxfordshire.
- Dr. John Merfyn Hywell Lloyd Parry. For services to Sports Medicine.
- Raymond Harold Parry, Emergency Planning Manager, London Underground. For services to Public Transport.
- Geoffrey Lloyd Parsons, Teacher, Vyners School, Ickenham, Hillingdon, London. For services to Education.
- Richard John Patterson, lately Chairman, Dorset ME Support Group. For charitable services to those with Chronic Fatigue Syndrome and Myalgic Encephalomyelitis.
- Michael Norman Pearn. For services to the community in Torpoint, Cornwall.
- Ann, Mrs. Pearse. For services to the community in Somerset.
- Thomas Perrett, Chair, Walsall New Deal for Communities. For services to the community in the West Midlands.
- Miss Eve Pettinger, Ballet Teacher, Arts Educational School, Tring. For services to Dance.
- Patricia Jane, Mrs. Phillips. For services to the Society for Promoting Christian Knowledge.
- Miss Zara Anne Elizabeth Phillips, Individual Three-Day Event World Champion. For services to Equestrianism.
- Stanley William Pike, lately Deputy Headteacher, Bosmere Junior School, Hampshire. For services to Education.
- Ms Julia Lucille Plaine, Co-ordinator, Sex Workers' Empowerment, Education and Training Project, Huddersfield. For services to Women.
- Sheila, Mrs. Pollitt, J.P., Member, Independent Monitoring Board. For services to H.M. Young Offenders' Institution Lancaster Farms, Lancashire.
- Catherine, Mrs. Potter, Specialist Bed Co-ordinator, Medway NHS Trust. For services to the NHS.
- Mary, Mrs. Potts. For services to the community in Sunderland, Tyne and Wear.
- Bevan Powell, Deputy Chair, Metropolitan Black Police Association. For services to the Police.
- Douglas Powell, Warden and Manager, East Mersea Youth Camp, Essex. For services to Young People. Ms Frances Mary Powell. For services to the Tourist Industry in Lincolnshire.
- Marguerita, Mrs. Powlesland. For services to the community in Hertfordshire.
- Bronwen, Mrs. Preece. For Charitable services to Healthcare in Swansea.
- Malcolm Preece, Project Manager, H.M. Revenue and Customs.
- Ms Carol Virginia Priestley, Director, International Network for the Availability of Scientific Publications. For services to Science in developing countries and emerging economies.
- Captain Ronald Pritchard, lately Regional Welfare Officer, Combat Stress. For services to Ex-Servicemen and Women.
- Canon Walter Patterson Quill. For services to the community in Castlederg, County Tyrone, Northern Ireland.
- Brian Alfred Rae. For services to the Meteorological Office and to the community in the Isle of Man.
- Gurdial Singh Rai. For services to the Sikh community in Dartford, Kent.
- Miss Sybil Evelyn Ralphs, Member, Bagnall Parish Council. For services to the community in North Staffordshire.
- Lillian Jane, Mrs. Ramsay, Founder and Director, The Eyeless Trust for Children and Young People Born Without Eyes. For services to Children and Families.
- Donald William Randall. For services to Law Enforcement in the City of London.
- Percival Rankin. For services to the Royal British Legion in Northern Ireland.
- Anthony James Ratcliffe. For services to the Environment in Suffolk.
- Dr. Keith Ray, County Archaeologist, Herefordshire Council. For services to Local Government.
- Linda Janice, Mrs. Rees, J.P. For services to the Administration of Justice in Port Talbot.
- Geraldine, Mrs. Rice, Councillor, Castlereagh Borough Council. For services to Local Government in Northern Ireland.
- The Reverend William Thomas John Richardson, lately Minister, Hillhall Presbyterian Church, Lisburn. For services to the community in Northern Ireland.
- Paul Christopher Ridgeon, Head of Special Projects, OYce of Government Commerce, H.M. Treasury.
- Miss Nancy Elizabeth Riegen. For services to the community in Milford-on-Sea, Hampshire.
- William Ritchie, Crofter Fisherman. For services to the Environment and to Sustainable Development in the Highlands and Islands.
- Ann Adele Susan Maria, Mrs. Roberts. For services to the community in Edenbridge, Kent.
- Anne, Mrs. Roberts, Head of Health Visiting and School Nursing, North Glamorgan NHS Trust. For services to Healthcare.
- Derek Paul de Villamar Roberts. For services to the History and Sport of Cycling.
- Miss Jean McHattie Roberts, Stoma Care Adviser, Sangers (NI) Ltd. For services to Stoma Care Nursing in Northern Ireland.
- Christina Waters Clapperton, Mrs. Robertson, lately Head of Department of Business, Management and Computing, Dumfries and Galloway College. For services to Lifelong Learning.
- Ms Suzanne Robson. For public service.
- Jennifer, Mrs. Rodgers, Administrative Assistant, The Pension Service, Department for Work and Pensions.
- Emmanuel Rodriguez, Trombonist. For services to Music.
- Eileen, Mrs. Roscoe, Youth Team Manager, Lancashire Learning and Skills Council. For services to Education and to Business.
- Dr. Euan James Ferguson Ross, lately Administrator, Chemistry Department, University of Durham. For services to Higher Education.
- Keith Raymond Roszell, Vice-Chair, Cornwall Area Committee, Fire Services National Benevolent Fund. For services to the Fire and Rescue Service.
- Robert Michael Rothenberg. For services to Business and to the community in London.
- Henry Rumbold. For services to Conservation and to the community in Ripon, North Yorkshire.
- Philip William Russell, Management Board Member, Workers' Safety Adviser Challenge Fund. For services to Health and Safety in the Construction Industry.
- David Sanderson, Chief Executive, Derwent Training Association, North Yorkshire. For services to Young People.
- Ms June Kunadu Sarpong. For services to Broadcasting and to Charity.
- Laura, Mrs. Sarti, Singing Teacher. For services to Music.
- Alison Marjorie Elizabeth, Mrs. Saunders. For charitable services.
- David William Saunders. For charitable services.
- Derek Duncan Saunders. For services to Ex-Servicemen and Women in Norfolk.
- Joseph Harry Saunders, Census Returns Indexer, National Archives and Family Records Centre. For services to Archiving.
- Michael Seals, Chair, National Fallen Stock Company
- Elvin Royston Sealy, J.P., lately Chair, Airlines Association of Barbados and the Airline Operators' Committee. For services to Civil Aviation.
- Kenneth Seed, Principal Officer, H.M. Prison Preston, H.M. Prison Service.
- Yvonne Carol, Mrs. Sessions, lately Clinical Service Manager, Learning Disability Services, Leeds Mental Health Teaching NHS Trust. For services to Healthcare.
- Dr. Ramendra Nath Seth. For services to Rotary International and to the community in Nottinghamshire.
- Victor Lockhart Shannon, Senior Principal Engineer, Ultra Electronics Holdings plc. For services to the Defence Industry.
- Derek George Sharman. For services to Heritage in Berwick-upon-Tweed.
- Raymond Alexander Sharpe. For services to the community in South East Wales.
- Ina Simpson, Mrs. Shaw. For services to Stirling Albion Football Club.
- Hannah Anne, Mrs. Shearer. For services to Older People in Birmingham, West Midlands.
- Ronald Charles Shelley. For services to the Association of Jewish Ex-Servicemen and Women and to the Jewish community in London.
- Ms Jane Shepherdson, Brand Director, TopShop. For services to the Retail Industry.
- Paul Edward Siddall, Executive Officer, Disability and Carers Service, Department for Work and Pensions.
- David Ross Simpson. For services to the community in Harrow, Middlesex.
- John Simpson, Works Operational Manager, Gateshead Health NHS Foundation Trust. For services to the NHS.
- Margaret Anne, Mrs. Sims, Senior Health Promotion Specialist, South Gloucestershire Primary Care Trust. For services to Healthcare.
- Nirmala, Mrs. Singhvi. For services to the community in Watford, Hertfordshire.
- Keith Victor Skipper, D.L. For services to the community in Norfolk.
- Offord Slater. For services to the Waste Management Industry and to the Environment in West Yorkshire.
- William Barry Slater. For services to the Boys' Brigade in Orkney.
- Donald Smallwood, Chair, Preston Road Neighbourhood Development Company. For services to the community in Kingston-upon-Hull.
- Peter Alexander Smart, Director of Adult Learning, Chichester College, West Sussex. For services to Further Education.
- Adrienne Elizabeth, Mrs. Smith, Assistant Headteacher, The North School, Ashford, Kent. For services to Education.
- Ms Lesley Smith, County Secretary, Devon Association of Parish Councils. For services to Local Government in the South West.
- Margaret Montgomery, Mrs. Smith. For services to the community in Glasgow.
- Irene Matilda, Mrs. Smyth, Recycling Centre Attendant, Magherafelt Recycling Centre. For services to Local Government in Northern Ireland.
- Samuel Alfred Matthew Smyth, Main Grade Officer, Limited. For services to the Farming Industry. Northern Ireland Prison Service.
- Ms Liz Snape, Director, Policy and Political Affairs, UNISON. For services to Diversity.
- Roy Malcolm Dudley-Southern, Team Leader and Strategic Planning Manager, Greater Manchester Primary Care Trusts Collaborative Commissioning Team. For services to the NHS.
- Miss Barbara Mary Speake, Founder, The Barbara Speake Theatre School and Agency. For services to Drama in London.
- Angela, Mrs. Spellman. For services to the community in Newbury, Berkshire.
- Anthony Noel Spencer, Chair, North West Housing Forum. For services to Social Housing.
- Lieutenant Commander Victor William Spong, Royal Naval Reserve (Ret'd). For services to the Sea Cadet Corps in Newcastle upon Tyne.
- Trevor Kenneth Stanbury, Partner, The Milky Way Adventure Park. For services to the Tourist Industry in the South West.
- Anthony John Stannard, Head Trainer, Malmesbury Amateur Boxing Club. For services to Sport in Wiltshire.
- Thomas Michael Robert Sterry. For charitable services.
- Dr. Peter Michael Collinson Stevens. For services to Conservation.
- Rosemary, Mrs. Stevenson. For services to the community in Ballantrae, Ayrshire.
- Jacqueline June, Mrs. Stimpson, Water Skier. For services to Disabled Sport.
- Lynn Maureen, Mrs. Storey, Lead Court Manager, Reading County Court, Her Majesty's Court Service.
- David Thomas Streeter, Reader in Ecology, University of Sussex. For services to Higher Education.
- Nancy, Mrs. Stuart, Grade B2, Sierra Leone Office, Department for International Development.
- John Christopher Sugden. For services to the community in Haslemere, Surrey.
- Matthew Tanner, Director, SS Great Britain Trust. For services to Maritime Conservation.
- Adelene Jarn, Mrs. Tasker. For services to Community Relations in North Lincolnshire.
- Dr. Trevor Taylor, Technical and Projects Director, MBDA UK. For services to the Defence Industry.
- Ms Elizabeth Joanna Terry, Managing Director, The Leisure Media Company Ltd. For services to the Publishing Industry.
- Nellie, Mrs. Thornton. For services to the community in Ilkley, West Yorkshire.
- Gwendoline May, Mrs. Timmins. For services to the community in Kingswinford, West Midlands.
- Michael John Tombs, Volunteer Co-ordinator, Volunteer Recognition, National Trust. For services to Heritage.
- Simon Manville Topman, Chair, Aston New Deal for Communities and Chief Executive, Acme Whistle Company. For services to Business and to the community in Birmingham.
- Edward Traynor. For services to the community in Easterhouse, Glasgow.
- Peter Quintrell Treloar. For services to the community in Calne, Wiltshire.
- Robert John Trevatt. For services to Homeless People in South Devon.
- Dr. John Kenneth Trigg, Vice-Principal, Tomlinscote School and Sixth Form College, Frimley, Surrey. For services to Education.
- Miss Florence Irene Tristram, Governor, Oliver Goldsmith Primary School, Southwark, London. For services to Education.
- Peter Troy, Head of Humanitarian Response Team.
- Paul Keith Trumble. For services to the community in Thanet, Kent.
- Fiona, Mrs. Tunstall, Clerical Assistant, St. Brigid's Primary School, Glasgow. For services to Special Needs Education.
- William Richard Turnbull, President, Network Russia Scout Fellowship. For services to International Scouting.
- Joseph Turner, Grade C2, Ministry of Defence.
- Reta Hodge, Mrs. Tweddle. For services to the community in Rowlands Gill, Tyne and Wear.
- Maureen Winifred, Mrs. Tweney. For services to the community in Oxford.
- Dr. Paul Anthony Twomey, General Medical Practitioner, Grimsby, North Lincolnshire. For services to Healthcare.
- Michael Tyler, Chair of Governors, Osmani Primary School, Tower Hamlets, London. For services to Education.
- Miss Mary Norah Barclay Tyrrell, Honorary Secretary, League of Friends, Gosport War Memorial Hospital, Hampshire. For charitable services.
- Ms Sylvia Sanderson Usher, Honorary Secretary, Development Education Centre, Hull. For services to Children and to Young People.
- Josephine, Mrs. Vary, Senior Youth and Community Learning Worker, Young Women's Outreach Project, Gateshead. For services to Young People.
- Derek Reed Varnals, Technical Adviser, British Phonographic Industry. For services to the Music Industry.
- Barry Vernon, Senior Physical Education Officer, H.M. Prison Kirklevington Grange, Yarm, Cleveland.
- Leslie Vince. For services to the Marfan Trust Charity.
- Marion, Mrs. Vincent. For services to the community in Rothley, Leicester.
- Susan, Mrs. Wade, Teaching Assistant, Hethersett High School, Norfolk. For services to Education.
- Audrey, Mrs. Wales, lately President, Ballymena Borough Chamber of Commerce and Industry. For services to Business and to the community in Ballymena, Northern Ireland.
- Michael Walker, General Engineering Manager, SERCO Defence and Aerospace. For services to the Defence Industry.
- Peter George Wallis, Non-Executive Director, former Thurrock Primary Care Trust. For services to the NHS.
- Lavinia, Mrs. Wallop, Trustee, NSPCC and President, NSPCC Chelsea Branch. For services to Children and Families.
- Patricia Eleanor, Mrs. Walls, Chair, Cats Protection Charity. For services to Animal Welfare.
- Edith Hazel, Mrs. Ward, Founder, Take Heart Support Group. For charitable services.
- Stella Maria, Mrs. Wardell. For services to the community in South West Surrey.
- Gillian, Mrs. Waterhouse, Head of Patient and PublicInvolvement, Heart of England NHS Trust. For services to the NHS.
- Anne Marie, Mrs. Waters, Watch Manager, RDS, Oxfordshire Fire and Rescue Service. For services to Fire Safety.
- Susan, Mrs. Watkin, lately Chair, Huntington's Disease Association. For charitable services.
- Bronwen, Mrs. Watson, Family Learning Co-ordinator, Rotherham Metropolitan Borough Council. For services to Adult Learning.
- Marion, Mrs. Watson, T.D., Member, Scottish Community Care Forum Management Committee. For services to the community in Helensburgh and Lomond.
- Robert John Frank Watson, Founder, Sobriety Boating Project for Ex-Offenders. For services to Young People.
- Nigel John Maple Way, Proprietor, Royal Castle Hotel. For services to the Hospitality Industry in Dartmouth, Devon.
- Miss Pearl Wheatley, Chair, Society for Lincolnshire History and Archaeology. For services to Heritage.
- Ann Denise, Mrs. White, Communications Higher Executive Officer and Chair, Charities Committee, Home Office.
- Ms Faye White, Captain, Arsenal Ladies' Football Club and England. For services to Sport.
- Raymond White, lately Principal Scientific Officer, National Gallery. For services to Museums.
- Audrey Maire, Mrs. Whitehead. For services to the community in Portsmouth.
- Barry Whitelock. For services to Inland Waterways in the North.
- Mervyn Whyte. For services to Motorcycle Racing in Northern Ireland.
- Willard Wigan, Micro Sculptor. For services to Art.
- Terry Wiggins, Sous Chef, House of Commons.
- John Henry Wilding. For services to Clock Making.
- Gwynneth, Mrs. Wilkes, Head, Diplomatic Team, Valuation Office Agency, H.M. Revenue and Customs.
- John Green-Wilkinson, M.C. For services to the community in Winchester.
- Marlene, Mrs. Williams, Higher Executive Officer, Jobcentre Plus, Department for Work and Pensions.
- Heather Rosalind, Mrs. Williamson. For services to the community in Malvern, Worcestershire.
- Janet, Mrs. Wilson. For services to the community in Haddington, East Lothian.
- Patrick Maurice Wixey. For services to Bird Conservation in Oxfordshire.
- Gary Wolstenholme, Amateur Golfer. For services to Sport.
- Linda, Mrs. Wood, Personal Assistant, Empire Test Pilots' School, QinetiQ. For services to the Aviation Industry.
- Patricia Ann, Mrs. Woodman, Member, North Kevesten District Council. For services to Local Government.
- Dr. Jennifer Anne Woolfe. For services to Nutrition.
- Janice Margaret, Mrs. Worters, Chief Officer, Voluntary Organisations Development Agency and Chair, North Tyneside Strategic Partnership. For services to the community in the North East.
- Professor Michael William David Wren, Consultant Microbiologist, University College London Hospitals NHS Foundation Trust. For services to Biomedical Services.
- Margaret, Mrs. Wright, President, Girlguiding Midlands Region. For services to Young People.
- Dr. Nancy Vivien Wylie, Regional Director, Aim Higher West Midlands. For services to Higher Education.
- William Hugh Yates, lately Deputy Chair, Suzy Lamplugh Trust. For services to Charity.
- Francis Dudgeon Bailey Young, Executive Head, Vice-Chancellor's Office, Queen's University Belfast. For services to Higher Education.
- John Nixon, Chief Executive Officer, Taipei European School. For services to education in Taiwan.

=== Royal Red Cross ===
==== Associate of the Royal Red Cross (ARRC) ====
- Lieutenant Commander Alison Jayne Hofman, Queen Alexandra's Royal Naval Nursing Service.
- Squadron Leader Patrick George Ferguson (5206623E), Princess Mary's Royal Air Force Nursing Service.
- Flight Sergeant Deborah Jane Jackson (H8234693), Princess Mary's Royal Air Force Nursing Service.

=== Queen's Police Medal ===
ENGLAND AND WALES

- Martin Bridger, Chief Superintendent, Metropolitan Police Service.
- Joseph Michael Edwards, Chief Constable, Sussex Police.
- Ms Rose Mary Fitzpatrick, Deputy Assistant Commissioner, Metropolitan Police Service.
- Sir Ronald Flanagan, G.B.E., Her Majesty's Chief Inspector of Constabulary.
- William Geddes, Constable, Avon and Somerset Constabulary.
- Ian Gedge, lately Constable, Kent Police.
- Richard Gething, Detective Superintendent, Metropolitan Police Service.
- Ms Catherine Margaret Jackson, Constable, West Yorkshire Police.
- Jonathan Simon Kaye, Commander, Metropolitan Police Service.
- David McWhirter, lately Chief Superintendent, Thames Valley Police.
- Richard Anthony Naylor, Chief Superintendent, Police Superintendents' Association of England and Wales.
- Patrick Parry, Detective Inspector, Derbyshire Constabulary.
- Thomas Jonathan Stoddart, Temporary Chief Constable, Durham Constabulary.
- Vincent Anthony Sweeney, Assistant Chief Constable, Greater Manchester Police.
- Ms Janet Turner, Chief Superintendent, West Midlands Police.
- Ms Michele Williams, Chief Superintendent, North Wales Police.
- Stephen Edward Wilmott, Detective Chief Superintendent, City of London Police.
- Paul John Wood, lately Deputy Chief Constable, South Wales Police.

SCOTLAND

- Malcolm Rae Dickson, Her Majesty's Assistant Inspector of Constabulary.
- David Mulhern, Interim Chief Executive of the Scottish Police Services Authority.
- Patrick John Shearer, Deputy Chief Constable, Grampian Police.

NORTHERN IRELAND

- Steven Gareth Callaghan, lately Detective Sergeant, Police Service of Northern Ireland.
- Derrick Louden, Inspector, Police Service of Northern Ireland.

=== Queen's Fire Service Medal ===
ENGLAND AND WALES

- Peter Hazeldine, Assistant Chief Fire Officer, Hertfordshire Fire and Rescue Service.
- Anthony Proctor, Deputy Chief Fire Officer, Greater Manchester County Fire and Rescue Service.
- Keith Ring, Assistant Inspector, Her Majesty's Fire Service Inspectorate.
- Tyrone Anthony Robinson, Watch Manager, London Fire Brigade.
- Simon Smith, Chief Fire Officer, North Wales Fire and Rescue Service.

SCOTLAND

- Eileen, Mrs. Baird, Deputy Chief Officer, Strathclyde Fire and Rescue Service.
- Wayne Terrance McCollin, Temporary Deputy Chief Fire Officer, Lothian and Borders Fire and Rescue Service.

=== The Queen's Volunteer Reserves Medal ===
ROYAL NAVY

- Warrant Officer 2nd Class Alan Starr, Royal Marines Reserve, P997670Q.

ARMY

- Colonel Magnus Von Schutz Cormack, T.D. (505155), late Queen's Own Yeomanry, Territorial Army.
- Lieutenant Colonel Kevin Frank Halus, T.D. (514207), The Royal Logistic Corps, Territorial Army.
- Major Thomas Finton O'Reilly (557959), General List, Territorial Army.
- Lieutenant Colonel David John Reynolds (546097), The Parachute Regiment, Territorial Army.
- Brigadier James Alexander John Thomson, O.B.E., T.D. (496402), late The Cheshire Regiment, Territorial Army.

ROYAL AIR FORCE

- Squadron Leader Alison Margaret Moodie (2625256F), Royal Auxiliary Air Force.

=== Colonial Police Medal ===
- Richard Horace Bosano, Superintendent, Royal Gibraltar Police.
- Randolph Osmond Liverpool, Superintendent, Bermuda Police Service.

== The Cook Islands ==
=== Order of the British Empire ===
==== Knight Commander of the Order of the British Empire (KBE) ====
- Dr. Terepai Tuamure-Maoate. For services to the community and the public sector.

==== Member of the Order of the British Empire (MBE) ====
- Selina, Mrs. Matenga-Napa. For services to sports, youth and the community.

=== British Empire Medal ===
- Matapo Paiere Mokoroa. For services to the community and the public sector.

== The Bahamas ==
=== Order of Saint Michael and Saint George ===
==== Dame Commander of the Order of St Michael and St George (DCMG) ====
- Marguerite M., Lady Pindling. For services to politics, community development and charities.

==== Knight Commander of the Order of St Michael and St George (KCMG) ====
- Baltron Benjamin Bethel, C.M.G. For public service, and services to the Church and Education.
- Garet Orlando Finlayson, O.B.E. For services to commerce and business.

==== Companion of the Order of St Michael and St George (CMG) ====
- Alfred Jarette. For services to banking and the public sector management.
- Basil Laselles Sands. For services to accountancy, the Anglican Church and the field of diplomacy.
- The Right Reverend Gilbert Arthur Thompson. For services to the Church and the community.

=== Order of the British Empire ===
==== Officer of the Order of the British Empire (OBE) ====
- Bishop Albert H. Hepburn. For services to religion and the community.
- Bishop William Michael Johnson. For services to religion, the Church and the community.
- Ms Nettica R. Symonette. For services to tourism.
- Herbert Leon Treco. For services to industry and the community.

==== Member of the Order of the British Empire (MBE) ====
- Bruce Charles Braynen. For services to politics, business and the community.
- Ms Willimae Bridgewater. For services to trade unions and the community.
- Eric Cash. For services to music, art and education.
- Ms Linda Ford. For services to sport.
- Levi Gibson. For services to real estate.
- Leon Rahming. For services to public transport.
- The Reverend Dr. John N. T. Rolle. For services to the Church.

==== British Empire Medal (BEM) ====
- Jane Adelia, Mrs. Adderley. For services to business, commerce, politics and the community.
- Kenneth Joseph Braynen. For services to politics and community development.
- Ms Oraline Butler. For services to politics and community welfare.
- John Lochley Cooper. For services to politics and community development.
- Ms Millicent Deveaux. For services to politics and community development.
- Cecilia Anne, Mrs. Grant. For services to politics and community development.
- Gloria Branulah, Mrs. Knowles. For services to business, commerce, politics and the community.
- The Reverend Dr. Henry Pratt. For services to politics and community development.
- Eric Wilmott. For contribution as a journalist and writer, and services to the community and to the Church in Fox Hill.

=== Queen's Police Medal (QPM) ===
- James Audley Carey. For services to the Royal Bahamas Police Force.
- Grafton O. Ifill (Senior). For services to the Royal Bahamas Police Force.

== Grenada ==
=== Order of the British Empire ===
==== Commander of the Order of the British Empire (CBE) ====
- Lawrence Lambert, M.B.E.

==== Officer of the Order of the British Empire (OBE) ====
- Gordon Steele. For services to banking.

==== Member of the Order of the British Empire (MBE) ====
- Horatio Brizan. For services to business.
- Jean, Mrs. Robinson. For services to the community.
- Cynthia, Mrs.Cruickshank-Telesford. For public service.

=== British Empire Medal (BEM) ===
- Anthony George. For services to art and culture.
- Norris Marshall. For services to farming.

== Solomon Islands ==
=== Order of Saint Michael and Saint George ===
==== Companion of the Order of St Michael and St George (CMG) ====
- The Honourable Bartholomew Aba'au Ulufa'alu. For services to politics and the community.

=== Order of the British Empire ===
==== Commander of the Order of the British Empire (CBE) ====
- Dr. Patrick Paia. For services to medicine.

==== Officer of the Order of the British Empire (OBE) ====
- Shadrach Timothy Fanega. For public service.
- Fred Iro Ganate. For public service.
- Timothy Riringa Kwaimani. For services to the Judiciary.

== Tuvalu ==
=== Order of the British Empire ===
==== Officer of the Order of the British Empire (OBE) ====
- Feue Tipu. For public and community service.

==== Member of the Order of the British Empire (MBE) ====
- Apisaloma Enelise. For public and community service.
- Litia Filipo, Mrs. Fakaoti. For public and community service.
- Pisila Telii, Mrs. Samuelu. For community service.

=== British Empire Medal (BEM) ===
- Kalena Lameko. For services to the community.
- Siotaloto Lusama. For public and community service.
- Valoa Samuelu. For public and community service.

== Saint Vincent and the Grenadines ==
=== Order of Saint Michael and Saint George ===
==== Companion of the Order of St Michael and St George (CMG) ====
- Bryan Jeeves. For service to the International Financial services sector.

=== Order of the British Empire ===
==== Officer of the Order of the British Empire (OBE) ====
- Dr. Gideon John Cordice, M.B.E. For services to medicine and health.
- Patrick Eugene Prescod, M.B.E. For services to music and education.

==== Member of the Order of the British Empire (MBE) ====
- Alpian Rudolph Otway Allen. For services to education and the community.
- Charles Cornelius James. For services to agriculture and the community.
- Pauldric Emmanuel Moses. For services to business.

== Belize ==
=== Order of the British Empire ===
==== Commander of the Order of the British Empire (CBE) ====
- Herbert Douglas Robert Lord, O.B.E. For public service.

==== Officer of the Order of the British Empire (OBE) ====
- Myrtle, Mrs. Palacio, M.B.E. For services to the community.
- Francis Anthony (Frankie) Reneau, M.B.E. For services to art and entertainment.

==== Member of the Order of the British Empire (MBE) ====
- William Arthur Neal. For services to arts and entertainment.
- David Nicolas Ruiz. For services to teaching, the community and culture.
- Ms Rosalie Staines. For services to the community.
- Ms Leela Vernon. For services to art and entertainment.

== Antigua and Barbuda ==
=== Queen's Police Medal (QPM) ===
- James Arthur Hill. For services to the Royal Police Force.

=== Queen's Police Medal (QPM) ===
- Baldwin Emanuel Joyce. For services to the Fire Department of the Royal Police Force.

== Saint Christopher and Nevis ==
=== Order of the British Empire ===
==== Officer of the Order of the British Empire (OBE) ====
- Dr. Mervyn Franklyn Laws. For services to medicine and public health.
