= Layne Witherell =

American writer

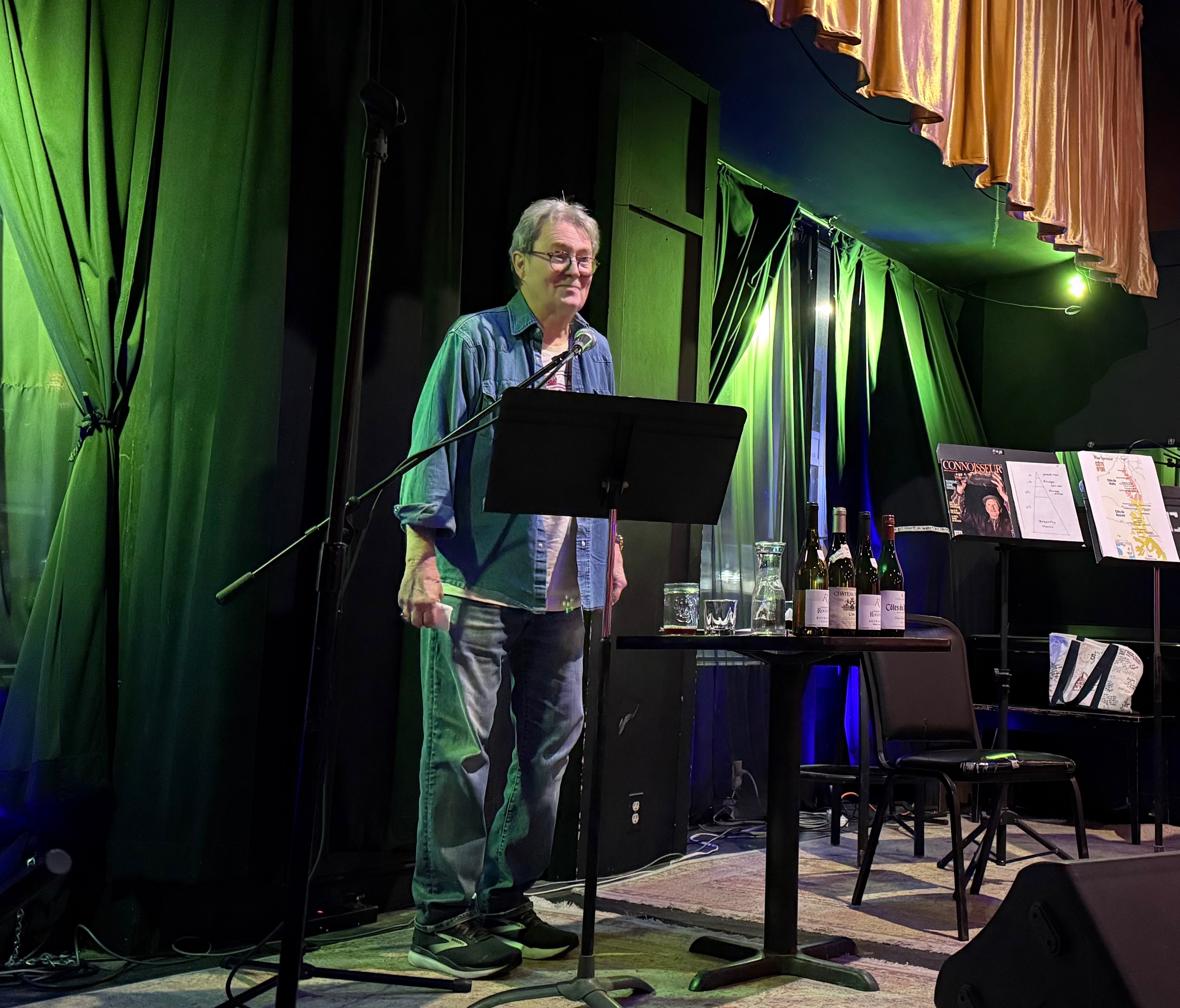
- Witherell in 2025
- Born: March 20, 1945 (age 81); Los Angeles, California, U.S.
- Education: San Francisco State University
- Occupation: Wine writer
- Awards: Master Knight of the Vine

Layne V. Witherell (born March 20, 1945) is an American wine writer. He has worked in the wine industry since the late 1970s, including as a wine importer, owning a retail wine store and as a wine salesperson. Awarded Master Knight of the Vine (KOV) for his work in promoting Pinot noir wine in Oregon, in 2010 he published his memoir, Wine Maniacs: Life in the Wine Biz.

== Early life ==
Witherell was born in 1945 in Los Angeles, California. His father died when Witherell was young.

Growing up in the 1960s, Witherell was a regular patron of the Ash Grove music club on Melrose Avenue. Between 1965 and 1970, he served in the United States Navy in Rota, Spain, when he became interested in wine after visiting a bodega. In 1970, he worked at Holmes Book Company in San Francisco.

In 1975, Witherell wrote his San Francisco State University undergraduate history thesis on the origins of wine in California between 1830 and 1870. In 1979, he moved to Portland, Oregon, and remained there until the mid-1980s. He also spent some time in Missoula, Montana.

== Career ==
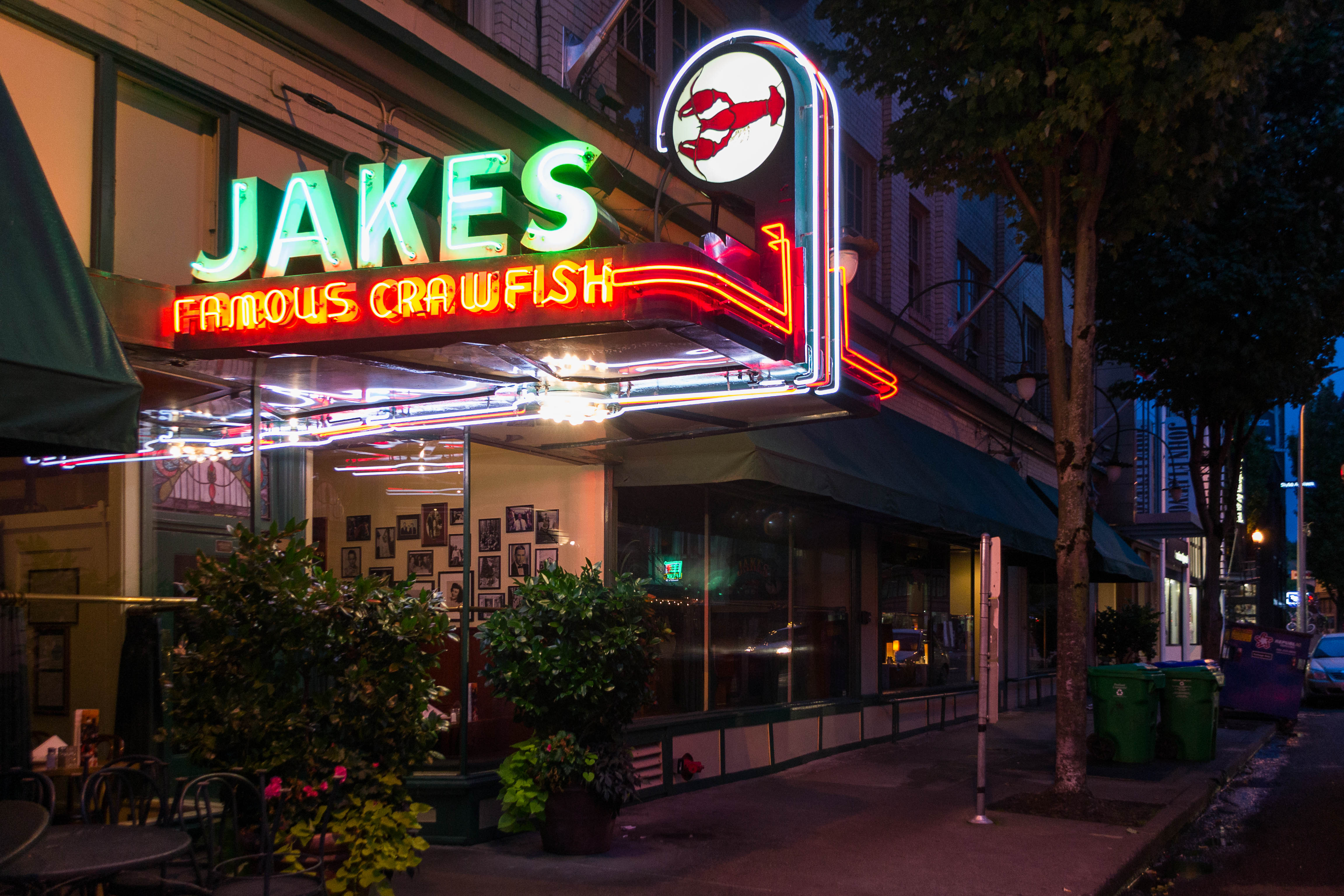
Witherell created the first wine list in Portland, Oregon, at Jake's Famous Crawfish

Witherell became vice-president of Oregon's Lemma Wine Company, owned by Greg Lemma.

In 1984, Witherell established Montdomaine Cellars winery in Charlottesville, Virginia. His winemaker was Shepard Rouse. Witherell wrote a weekly wine column for the Richmond Times-Dispatch, and it was during his time in Richmond, Virginia, that Witherell was invited to interview noted winemaker Angelo Gaja. He also taught wine classes at the University of Virginia.

In 2010, Witherell published his memoir, Wine Maniacs: Life in the Wine Biz, having been inspired by Anthony Bourdain's Kitchen Confidential (2000) and Anatomy of the Wine Trade (1985) by British writer Simon Loftus. A revised version of Witherell's book was issued in 2020.

Witherell has been awarded the Master Knight of the Vine (KOV) for his work in promoting Oregon wines, specifically pairing it with salmon. He had arrived in Portland, Oregon, when there were only ten wineries in the state. He put the first Pinot noir on Portland's first wine list, at Jake's Famous Crawfish.

He retired from his final full-time role, as general manager of Maine Beverage, in 2011. He worked a part-time role as "the wine guy" for Portland's Trader Joe's between 2012 and 2024.

As of 2026, Witherell writes a wine column for West End News in Portland, Maine, where he has lived since the 1990s. He also wrote for the Portland Phoenix until it ceased publication in 2023.

== Personal life ==
In 1996, Witherell married Judy, a native of Burnham, Maine, whom he met in Richmond. They live in the Bramhall neighborhood of Portland. He has a son from his first marriage.
