= Genevra Richardson =

British legal scholar

Genevra Mercy Richardson, CBE, FBA (born 1 September 1948) is a British legal scholar, specialising in public and administrative law. From 2005 to 2017, she was Professor of Law at King's College, London. She has served as Vice President (Public Policy) of the British Academy since 2016. She previously taught and researched at the University of Oxford, the University of East Anglia, and Queen Mary, University of London, where she was Dean of its Faculty of Law.

== Honours ==
In the 2007 New Year Honours, Richardson was appointed a Commander of the Order of the British Empire (CBE) for services to public law. In June 2007, she was elected a Fellow of the British Academy (FBA), the United Kingdom's national academy for the humanities and social sciences.
