= Roswyn Hakesley-Brown =

British nurse and researcher

Roswyn Hakesley-Brown, CBE, MPhil, BA, RN, RM, DN (Lond), Cert Ed (Birmingham) is a British nurse and researcher. She was president of the Royal College of Nursing (2000–02).

In July 2004, then-Minister for Health, John Hutton MP, launched a strategy for integrating refugee nurses into the health and social care workforce. The strategy was developed by the Refugee Nurses Task Force which she chaired. Hakesley-Brown was Special Education Projects Manager at the University of Glamorgan.

She was appointed CBE in the 2007 New Year Honours.
