= Larry Hirst =

Former Chairman of IBM Europe, Middle East, and Africa

Larry Hirst CBE is the former chairman of IBM Europe, Middle East and Africa. He was appointed to this position in April, 2008 and retired from IBM in July 2010.

He represented IBM to the European Commission and other authorities such as NATO and the EDA on issues of international public policy and business regulation. He also oversaw the company's corporate citizenship, environmental affairs, intellectual property, standards development and university relations activities across the region.

Prior to that role, Hirst led IBM's business in the UK, Ireland, Netherlands and South Africa between 2002 and 2008.

He began his IBM career as a sales trainee in 1977. Leadership roles included Director of Operations in Eastern Europe and Russia (1990-1) and Vice President of the Financial Services Sector in EMEA (1994-2001).

Hirst has a number of roles that support his twin passions of educational improvement and information technology. He is Chairman of the 'Transition to Teaching' Steering Committee, appointed by the UK Secretary of State for education; he is also Chairman of e-skills UK, the Sector Skills Council for IT, Telecoms and Contact Centres. In 2007, he was appointed Commissioner at the UK Government's Commission for Employment and Skills. The following year he was made Chairman of the UK Trade and Investment Executive Board, responsible for driving the UK's trade and investment objectives in the telecoms and IT sectors.

Outside the UK, Hirst is a Foundation Board Member of IMD, the Swiss-based global business school, and is Advisor to the Presidential Advisory Council on Information Society and Development (PIAC) in South Africa.

Born in Batley in 1951, Hirst grew up in Chickenley and went to Wheelwright Grammar School. Married with two children, Hirst graduated in mathematics from Hull University. He started his career as a salesman with Kodak and in 1977 joined IBM in London as a sales trainee.

Hirst's career was celebrated in October 2006 in the Men of Science exhibition, which commemorated the work of Dewsbury men who had made a difference to the world of science and industry.

In December 2009, he was announced as a private sector Business Ambassador by UK Prime Minister Gordon Brown, a role created to promote UK excellence.

Larry was appointed C.B.E. in the 2007 New Year Honours, in recognition of Services to the IT industry.

== Personal life ==
Larry Hirst was said to be too unwell to attend the 2013 trial of IBM UK Holdings, the company of which he had been general manager and chief executive.
