= Garet 'Tiger' Finlayson =

Bahamian business magnate

Sir Garet 'Tiger' Orlanda Finlayson, KCMG OBE (born 4 August 1937 in Andros) is a Bahamian businessman.

== Early life ==
Finlayson was born in 1937, the son of Hastings Finlayson, a tailor, and Maud (née Rolle) Finlayson.

== Business career ==
Tiger Finlayson is one of the most successful black businessman in the Bahamas. At one time, Finlayson owned more than half the businesses on Bay Street, the Bahamas' leading shopping street. Previously, Bay Street businesses were owned for generations by white business merchants known as the Bay Street Boys.

Finlayson owns leading Bahamian businesses Solomon Mines (luxury retail goods), Burns House and Butler & Sands (liquor stores). Over the years, Finlayson's business concerns have included car dealerships, hotels, furniture, office products and restaurant businesses.

Finlayson's acquisition of Solomon Mines in 2004–2005, however, was less successful with closures and the loss of jobs in 2015.

In 2023, Finlayson and his son, Mark, were ordered to pay a $2.763 million outstanding balance to Caterpillar Financial Services Corporation on a defaulted loan secured on their yacht, Maratani X. The pair failed to convince the Court of Appeal to block a $2.743 million judgment arguing that enforcing the judgment would cause them "grave commercial harm" and potentially ruin them. The court found no evidence to support the claims but granted them permission to appeal to the Privy Council.

== Awards and legacy ==
A philanthropist, Finlayson has donated millions of dollars in scholarships to allow young people to attend university, something Finlayson himself never did.

In 1999, Finlayson was made an Officer of the Order of the British Empire (OBE) for services to the economic growth and development of the Bahamas.

In the 2007 New Year Honours List, Finlayson was made a Knight Commander of the Order of St Michael and St George (KCMG).

== Personal life ==
Finlayson was married to Lady Rowena Frances Finlayson (née Rolle), with whom he had four children: Tanya Finlayson-Tynes, Rae Finlayson, Nikki Finlayson-Boeuf, and Mark Finlayson. She died in 2020.
