= Debbie Coulter =

British trade union leader

Debbie Coulter (née Allen, born 1960/1961) is a British former trade union leader.

Born in Egremont as Debbie Allen, she attended St Mary's Comprehensive School in Wallasey, then worked in office administration for various companies. When she was 18, she was sacked for encouraging colleagues to join a trade union. She married, but her husband died before 1991.

Coulter found work at a tailors in Barnsley, and while there studied trade unionism at college. In 1987, she began working full-time for the National Union of Tailors and Garment Workers (NUTGW). In 1991, the NUTGW merged into the GMB union, and Coulter worked as an organiser in Sheffield, then in the regional office in Leeds, before becoming a senior organiser in Wakefield.

In 2003, Coulter was elected as deputy general secretary of the GMB, the most senior role any woman had held in the union. She ran on a joint ticket with Kevin Curran, who became general secretary. Breaches of the election rules emerged, and Coulter complied with the investigation. She was re-elected in a re-run election, in 2004. Curran chose to resign, and Coulter became acting general secretary. Coulter was initially considered the front-runner to replace Curran, but later in the year, Paul Kenny replaced her as acting general secretary, and he ultimately won election to the post.

Coulter served on the National Executive Committee of the Labour Party from 2003 until 2008, and chaired the party conference in 2005. In the 2007 New Year Honours, she was made an Officer of the Order of the British Empire. She left the GMB in 2008, at which point she was praised for her work on equalities, and with retired members. She began working for the Ethical Trading Initiative, and was also appointed to the council of Acas.

Trade union offices
Preceded by Steve Pickering	Deputy General Secretary of the GMB; 2003–2008	Succeeded by Position vacant
