= Sheila Glennis Haworth =

Sheila Glennis Haworth (31 May 1939 – 23 October 2020) was a British paediatric cardiologist and academic at the UCL Great Ormond Street Institute of Child Health. She specialised in pulmonary hypertension in children, and established the UK Paediatric Pulmonary Hypertension Service.

== Career ==
Haworth was raised in Keighley, West Yorkshire, and graduated from medical school in London in 1960. She began her medical training with house posts and training positions at the Royal Free Hospital, the Queen Elizabeth Hospital for Children, Hammersmith Hospital, and Great Ormond Street Hospital, and also completed a fellowship in neonatology at New York's Columbia University in 1967. She became an honorary consultant at the UCL Great Ormond Street Institute of Child Health in 1977 and was appointed the British Heart Foundation Professor of Paediatric Cardiology at the Institute of Child Health in 1988, a position that she held for 17 years.

She specialised in the vascular abnormalities of congenital heart disease and particularly pulmonary hypertension, leading her to establish the UK Paediatric Pulmonary Hypertension Service in 2002. As part of the service, she travelled across the UK to set up and visit numerous specialised pulmonary hypertension clinics. She co-founded the Pulmonary Vascular Research Institute in 2006 and served as the organisation's president in 2014–2016.

Haworth was elected as a Fellow of the Academy of Medical Sciences in 1999. In 2007, she was awarded a CBE for services to cardiology. Over her career, she authored over 200 journal articles and over 50 book chapters.

== Personal life ==
Haworth was married to Major General Leslie Busk, former director general of the British Heart Foundation. She died at her home in Oxfordshire in October 2020.
