= Pulmonary Circulation =

- Discipline: Pulmonary circulation, pulmonary vascular disease
- Language: English
- Edited by: Jason X.-J. Yuan, Nicholas W. Morrell

Publication details
- History: 2011–present
- Publisher: Sage Publications on behalf of the Pulmonary Vascular Research Institute
- Frequency: Quarterly
- Open access: Yes

Standard abbreviations
- ISO 4: Pulm. Circ.

Indexing
- ISSN: 2045-8932 (print); 2045-8940 (web)
- JSTOR: 20458932
- OCLC no.: 741251892

Links
- Journal homepage; Online access; Online archive

Pulmonary Circulation is a peer-reviewed medical journal covering the fields of pulmonary circulation and pulmonary vascular disease. It was established in 2011 and is published by Sage Publications on behalf of the Pulmonary Vascular Research Institute, of which it is an official journal. The editors-in-chief are Jason X.-J. Yuan and Nicholas W. Morrell.

== Abstracting and indexing ==
The journal is abstracted and indexed in BIOSIS Previews and Science Citation Index Expanded.
