= Soraya Dhillon =

British pharmacologist

Soraya Dhillon MBE holds the title professor emeritus at the University of Hertfordshire known for her work in the field of clinical pharmacokinetics, drug handling, patient safety, and the evaluation of the role of the pharmacist in health care. She is a fellow of the Royal Pharmaceutical Society.

== Education and career ==
Dhillon studied pharmacy at undergraduate level, before earning her PhD in clinical pharmacology from the University of London in 1981. In 1989 she developed one of the first clinical pharmacokinetic services at Northwick Park Hospital, Harrow. In 1993, she moved to the London School of Pharmacy as a clinical pharmacist. In 2004 Dhillon was appointed head of a new School of Pharmacy at the University of Hertfordshire, and during her time in this position she implemented postgraduate programmes for pharmacy education. As of 2021, she is Professor Emeritus in Clinical Pharmacology at the University of Hertfordshire.

== Research ==
Dhillon's Ph.D. research examined the interactions between drugs used to treat epilepsy. Her subsequent work centered on improving how medicines are prescribed to patients and training of new pharmacists.

== Selected publications ==
- Clinical pharmacokinetics. Soraya Dhillon, Andrzej, MRPharmS Kostrzewski. London: Pharmaceutical Press. 2006. ISBN 978-0-85369-571-4. OCLC 66385369.
- Pharmacy case studies. Soraya Dhillon, Rebekah Raymond. London: Pharmaceutical Press. 2009. ISBN 978-0-85369-724-4. OCLC 260210192.

== Honors and awards ==
Dhillon was named a fellow of the Royal Pharmaceutical Society (RPS). In 2007, she was awarded an MBE, the first University of Hertfordshire academic to receive this honour. In 2008, Dhillon received the Royal Pharmaceutical Society Charter Gold Medal.
