= Christine King =

British historian and university administrator

Christine Elizabeth King, CBE, FRHistS, DL is a British historian and university administrator. She was Vice-Chancellor and Chief Executive of Staffordshire University from 1995 to 2011.

King has published extensively on the Third Reich and is considered an expert on Nazi Germany. She was formerly head of the School of Historical and Critical Studies and Dean of the Faculty of Arts at Lancashire Polytechnic. In 1990 she was appointed Assistant Director of Staffordshire Polytechnic, which became Staffordshire University in 1992.

== Honours ==
King was appointed Commander of the Order of the British Empire (CBE) in the 2007 New Year Honours list for services to higher education. She is a Fellow of the Royal Historical Society and a Deputy Lieutenant for Staffordshire.

== Selected publications ==
- "Strategies for Survival: An Examination of the History of Five Christian Sects in Germany 1933-45" in Journal of Contemporary History Vol. 14, No. 2 (April 1979), pp. 211–233
- The Nazi state and the new religions: five case studies in non-conformity, 1982, Edwin Mellen Press (ISBN 978-0889468658)
- Through the Glass Ceiling: Effective Senior Management Development for Women, 1993, Tudor Business Publishing (ISBN 1872807550)
