= Steve Ridgway =

British businessman (born 1951)

Stephen Ridgway, CBE (born 29 September 1951) is a British business executive best known for having been the CEO of Virgin Atlantic.

== Early life ==
Ridgway was born in Tavistock, Devon, and grew up on a farm in Bantham near Salcombe. He went to school in Kingsbridge, south Devon.

He gained an Economics BSc degree (awarded by the University of London) from Oxford Polytechnic. He later gained a PGCE in 1976.

== Career ==
Ridgway worked for Cavenham Foods as a sales manager, and briefly became a teacher. He moved to Miami and began his business career working for a builder of power boats, Ted Toleman. He worked for two years as Business Development Manager at the Toleman Group. One of these boats was the Virgin Atlantic Challenger, and he became the Chief Pilot. From 1981 to 1985 he worked for Cougar Marine, who built the Virgin boats.

=== Virgin Atlantic ===
Ridgway joined Virgin Atlantic in 1989. In 1990, he became managing director of Virgin Freeway. He became a board director in 1994. Formerly Virgin Atlantic's vice-president of customer services, he was appointed as managing director of Virgin Atlantic in April 1998. He became Chief Executive in October 2001.

He announced his retirement as CEO of Virgin Atlantic on 10 September 2012, and left the company on 1 February 2013.

He has built the £13.5m St Moritz Hotel in Trebetherick, Cornwall, with his brother Hugh.

== Personal life ==
Ridgway has three children and lives in London and Sussex. His children were educated at St Edward's School, Oxford the same school where Sir Richard Branson had his children educated. He enjoys sailing and fast cars. He was awarded a CBE in the 2006 New Year Honours.
