= Pulmonary Vascular Research Institute =

British charitable organization

- Formation: 2006
- Type: Charitable Organisation
- Headquarters: 5 Tanner St, London SE1 3LE
- Key people: Professor Anna Hemnes (President), Karen Osborn (CEO)
- Website: www.pvrinstitute.org

The Pulmonary Vascular Research Institute (PVRI) is a global medical research charity. It is registered Charity in the United Kingdom (Charity No: 1127115) and a private limited company by guarantee. The company registration number is 5780068. The PVRI is a professional membership organisation for doctors and scientists from around the world who have a special interest in pulmonary hypertension (PH) or pulmonary vascular diseases (PVD).

== History ==
The concept of the PVRI as a research and educational institute catering to the global PVD community was initiated by Professor Ghazwan Butrous. The initial planning was conducted during a meeting at Heathrow, UK, with the key founders being Ghazwan Butrous, Stuart Rich, Martin Wilkins, Evangelos Michelakis, Marc Semigran, and Fritz Grimminger. In 2006, the organisation was formally established, and in 2007, it was registered as a charity in the UK. The PVRI commenced its operations with an inaugural meeting in Malta, attended by 25 PH professionals, who formed the framework of the organisation with the objective of mitigating the disease's global impact through study, instruction, and clinical care. The PVRI operates a virtual platform for networking between scientists and physicians, headquartered in the United Kingdom.

== Organisation ==
PVRI operations are governed by the PVRI Board of Directors. The executive branch comprises the President, who serves two-year terms, and the Chief Executive Officer, who is supported by administrative staff, and is responsible for overseeing the day-to-day operations of the PVRI. The PVRI has formed several "Task Forces," or specialised teams, to draw attention to particular PVDs.

== Pulmonary vascular disease ==
It is generally understood that having high blood pressure can cause problems and reduce life expectancy. High blood pressure usually refers to the pressure in all the organs of the body, except for the lungs. It is very rare to find high blood pressure only in the lungs, but when it occurs, it is often deadly. This condition is called pulmonary hypertension, which leads to pulmonary vascular disease (PVD), the progressive obstruction of the lung blood vessels. This disease is incurable and often fatal. It often has a quiet and insidious onset and therefore the diagnosis is delayed, usually for about two years, by which time the patient is severely compromised. The sufferer gradually becomes short of breath and very tired, finds everyday activities exhausting and can no longer work or carry out everyday tasks. PVD affects all ages and social demographics across the globe. The heart has to work very hard to pump blood through the narrowed arteries in the lungs and eventually the patient develops severe heart failure. PVD can occur as a primary disorder, but there are also various factors which can contribute to PVD, such as living in high altitude, obesity, prolonged and strenuous exercise, congenital heart disease and various other causes.

It is estimated that over 60 million people in the world suffer from PVD, although this figure could be much higher as the disease is often undiagnosed or misdiagnosed.

== Events and activities ==
The PVRI hosts two scientific meetings each year - the Annual Congress (held in January/February) and the Drug Discovery and Development Symposium (held in July). These meetings provide a forum for scientists and researchers in the field of pulmonary vascular disease, the pharmaceutical industry, and relevant regulatory authorities to determine which treatments should be developed for future use.

In addition to the two international scientific meetings, the PVRI Regional Task Forces organise local and national meetings to raise awareness of PVD. Additionally, the PVRI co-sponsors and supports a number of regional and worldwide events with the aim of advancing research and activities in the PVD field.

Members of the PVRI have access to an online library of clinical management guidelines, educational materials, advice, and information about current research initiatives and clinical trials.

Publications: the PVRI published its first periodical, the PVRI Review, in 2008-2011. The PVRI's official scientific journal, Pulmonary Circulation, is an international, peer-reviewed medical research journal that focuses exclusively on publishing original research, review articles, case reports, guidelines, and consensus articles in the fields of pulmonary circulation and pulmonary vascular disease. In 2011, several PVRI members collaborated to produce the Textbook of Pulmonary Vascular Disease.

== Publications ==
The PVRI's official scientific journal, Pulmonary Circulation, is an international, peer-reviewed medical research journal focused on publishing original research, review articles, case reports, guidelines and consensus articles exclusively in the fields of the pulmonary circulation and pulmonary vascular disease. It is published on behalf of the PVRI by Wiley.

In 2011, several PVRI members collaborated to produce the Textbook of Pulmonary Vascular Disease.

== Funding ==
The PVRI raises funds through membership contributions and fees to scientific events. Additionally, the PVRI receives grants from industry bodies and educational funds for its various initiatives.

== Current major activities ==
The PVRI is currently involved in several significant initiatives, including the GoDeep meta-registry, the Papuca study, and the Innovative Drug Development Initiative (IDDI), where industry, academia, and clinicians collaborate to develop PH therapeutic outcomes quickly and safely.
