= Simon Loftus =

British wine trader, restaurateur and writer

Simon Piers Dominic Loftus, OBE, is a British wine trader, restaurateur and writer on wine and travel. Following in his parents' footsteps, he joined the Adnams brewery in Southwold in 1969 and rose to become chairman in 1995. He retired in 2006, the same year that he received an OBE.

Loftus is the author of several books including Anatomy of the Wine Trade, Puligny-Montrachet: Journal of a Village in Burgundy, and A Pike in the Basement. Puligny-Montrachet won the Glenfiddich Award, while Hugh Fearnley-Whittingstall said of Pike: "a heartfelt, witty prescription for a life worth aspiring to."

His latest book, out in April 2013, is The Invention of Memory: An Irish Family Scrapbook

He is a descendant of the Irish-British businessman and politician Pierse Loftus. He lives in Suffolk.
