= 2010–11 Accrington Stanley F.C. season =

Accrington Stanley
2010–11 season
- Chairman: Ilyas Khan
- Manager: John Coleman
- Stadium: Crown Ground
- League Two: 5th (Qualified to Promotion Playoffs)
- FA Cup: 2nd round
- League Cup: 2nd round
- Football League Trophy: 1st round (Northern Section)
- Top goalscorer: League: Terry Gornell, Phil Edwards & Sean McConville all 13; All: Terry Gornell, Phil Edwards & Sean McConville all 13
- Highest home attendance: 4,185 (versus Stevenage)
- Lowest home attendance: 1,356 (versus Crewe Alexandra)
- Average home league attendance: 1,868
Home colours	Away colours

The 2010–11 season achieved the highest ever league placing for Accrington Stanley to date when they reached 5th in League Two, beating their previous best of 15th in 2009–10. This took them through to the League Two Play Offs for the first time, where they lost to Stevenage 3–0 on aggregate in the semi-final.

== Current squad ==
=== First Team squad ===
Updated 6 May 2011.

Note: Flags indicate national team as defined under FIFA eligibility rules; some limited exceptions apply. Players may hold more than one non-FIFA nationality.

No.	Pos.	Nation	Player
1	GK	AUS	Alex Cisak
2	DF	ENG	Jonathan Bateson
3	DF	ENG	Dean Winnard
4	DF	ENG	Sean Hessey
5	DF	ENG	Kevin Long
6	MF	ENG	Andrew Procter (captain)
7	MF	IRL	Jimmy Ryan
8	MF	ENG	Charlie Barnett
9	FW	ENG	Craig Lindfield
10	MF	ENG	Ray Putterill
11	MF	ENG	Sean McConville
12	DF	ENG	Phil Edwards
13	DF	ENG	Leam Richardson

No.	Pos.	Nation	Player
14	MF	ENG	Luke Joyce
15	MF	ENG	Andy Parkinson
16	MF	ENG	Chris Turner
17	DF	ENG	Peter Murphy
19	FW	ENG	Rory Boulding
20	MF	ENG	Alan Burton
21	DF	ENG	Zak Riley
22	DF	ENG	Andy Owens
23	DF	ENG	Tom Smyth
24	FW	ENG	Terry Gornell
25	GK	ENG	Ian Dunbavin
27	MF	ENG	Ian Craney

== Fixtures and results ==
=== Pre-season ===
13 Jul 2010	Clitheroe	3–3	Accrington Stanley	Shawbridge, Clitheroe
19:45 BST	Parillion; Corr; McManus		Devenney; Edwards; Boulding	Attendance: 410

15 Jul 2010	Heswall	1–5	Accrington Stanley	Gayton Park, Heswall
19:45 BST				Attendance: 81

24 Jul 2010	Northwich Victoria	0–3	Accrington Stanley	Victoria Stadium, Northwich
15:00 BST			Putterill 54'; Boulding 77'; Jukes 90'	Attendance: 164

27 Jul 2010	Southport	1–2	Accrington Stanley	Haig Avenue, Southport
19:45 BST	Lever 77'		Davis 6' (o.g.); Edwards 37' (pen.)

29 Jul 2010	AFC Fylde	2–3	Accrington Stanley	Kellamergh Park, Warton
19:45 BST

=== JOMA South West Challenge Cup ===
The South West Challenge Cup is a pre-season friendly tournament in North Devon. Rules are different from main first team football in that n the group stage matches, each half lasts 40 minutes, before reverting to the standard 45 minutes for the knockout stages. The tournament features an unconventional points system through the group stages, which the tournament organisers state is "designed to encourage attacking football".

- Each winning side gets the standard three points for a win.
- Losing teams receive one point if they lose without scoring, and two if they lose but score.
- There are no draws; if teams are all square at full-time the game goes straight to a penalty shootout to determine the winner.

20 July 2010	Accrington Stanley	1–2	Blackpool	Vicarage Field, Great Torrington
19:30 BST	Ryan 10'		Ormerod 4'; Southern 48'

21 July 2010	Bideford	2–5	Accrington Stanley	The Sports Ground, Bideford
20:00 BST	Densham; Downing		Putterill; Jukes; McConville; Parkinson

==== Group 1 ====
South West Challenge Cup

=== League Two ===
7 August 2010 1	Accrington Stanley	0–0	Aldershot Town	Accrington
15:00 BST		Report		Stadium: Crown Ground; Attendance: 1,624

14 August 2010 2	Northampton Town	0–0	Accrington Stanley	Northampton
15:00 BST		Report		Stadium: Sixfields Stadium; Attendance: 4,042

21 August 2010 3	Accrington Stanley	3–0	Macclesfield Town	Accrington
15:00 BST	McConville 29', 38', 72'	Report		Stadium: Crown Ground; Attendance: 1,371

28 August 2010 4	Oxford United	0–0	Accrington Stanley	Oxford
15:00 BST		Report		Stadium: Kassam Stadium; Attendance: 6,428

4 September 2010 5	Accrington Stanley	1–1	Wycombe Wanderers	Accrington
15:00 BST	Boulding 90'	Report	Bloomfield 67'	Stadium: Crown Ground; Attendance: 1,610

11 September 2010 6	Torquay United	0–0	Accrington Stanley	Torquay
15:00 BST		Report		Stadium: Plainmoor; Attendance: 2,598

17 September 2010 7	Accrington Stanley	3–0	Lincoln City	Accrington
19:45 BST	McConville 16'; Gornell 19', 60'	Report	Kerr (red card) 71'	Stadium: Crown Ground; Attendance: 1,844

25 September 2010 8	Port Vale	2–0	Accrington Stanley	Burslem, Stoke-on-Trent
15:00 BST	M.Richards 31'; Dodds 81'	Report		Stadium: Vale Park; Attendance: 5,777

28 September 2010 9	Stockport County	2–2	Accrington Stanley	Stockport
19:45 BST	Fisher 78'; Donnelly 84'	Report	Procter 48'; Gornell 76'	Stadium: Edgeley Park; Attendance: 3,584

2 October 2010 10	Accrington Stanley	7–4	Gillingham	Accrington
15:00 BST	McConville 13'; Parkinson 34'; Barnett 43'; Edwards 58' (pen.), 62' (pen.); Gornell 73'; Ryan 90'	Report	Bentley 29', 31'; McDonald 55'; Akinfenwa 79' (pen.); Bentley (red card) 87'	Stadium: Crown Ground; Attendance: 1,933

9 October 2010 11	Bury	3–0	Accrington Stanley	Bury
15:00 BST	Lowe 13', 45'; Ajose 57'	Report	Procter (red card) 75'; Bateson (red card) 82'	Stadium: Gigg Lane; Attendance: 4,164

16 October 2010 12	Accrington Stanley	2–3	Rotherham United	Accrington
15:00 BST	Parkinson 9'; Ryan 49'; Long (red card) 17'	Report	Le Fondre 18' (pen.); Geohaghon 81'; Cresswell 90'	Stadium: Crown Ground; Attendance: 2,256

23 October 2010 13	Hereford United	1–1	Accrington Stanley	Hereford
15:00 BST	Manset 54'	Report	Ryan 25'	Stadium: Edgar Street; Attendance: 2,434

30 October 2010 14	Accrington Stanley	2–4	Cheltenham Town	Accrington
15:00 BST	Gornell 51'; Edwards 88' (pen.)	Report	Smikle 4'; Goulding 18', 74'; Shroot 80'	Stadium: Crown Ground; Attendance: 1,427

2 November 2010 15	Chesterfield	5–2	Accrington Stanley	Chesterfield
19:45 GMT	Davies 8', 88'; Whitaker 41' (pen.), 56'; Lester 42'	Report	Edwards 17' (pen.); Gornell 60'	Stadium: B2net Stadium; Attendance: 6,034

13 November 2010 16	Southend United	1–1	Accrington Stanley	Southend-on-Sea
15:00 GMT	Bilel 65'	Report	Ryan 26'; Murphy (red card) 78'	Stadium: Roots Hall; Attendance: 4,748

20 November 2010 17	Accrington Stanley	1–0	Stevenage	Accrington
15:00 GMT	McConville 67'	Report		Stadium: Crown Ground; Attendance: 1,370

23 November 2010 18	Bradford City	1–1	Accrington Stanley	Bradford
19:45 GMT	Price 54'	Report	Edwards 21' (pen.)	Stadium: Valley Parade; Attendance: 10,392

11 December 2010 19	Barnet	2–0	Accrington Stanley	High Barnet, London
15:00 GMT	McLeod 12', 45'	Report		Stadium: Underhill Stadium; Attendance: 2,250

1 January 2011 20	Morecambe	1–2	Accrington Stanley	Morecambe
15:00 GMT	McCready 27'	Report	Edwards 17'; Ryan 82'	Stadium: Globe Arena; Attendance: 2,702

3 January 2011 21	Accrington Stanley	2–2	Chesterfield	Accrington
15:00 GMT	McConville 10'; Gornell 24'	Report	Smalley 88'; Boden 90'	Stadium: Crown Ground; Attendance: 2,041

8 January 2011 22	Accrington Stanley	1–0	Bury	Accrington
15:00 GMT	Jacobson 77'	Report		Stadium: Crown Ground; Attendance: 2,481

15 January 2011 23	Cheltenham Town	1–2	Accrington Stanley	Cheltenham
15:00 GMT	Thomas 83'	Report	Gornell 39'; Richardson 89'	Stadium: Whaddon Road; Attendance: 2,736

18 January 2011 24	Accrington Stanley	1–3	Shrewsbury Town	Accrington
15:00 GMT	Gornell 47'	Report	Collins 50', 71'; Wright 83'	Stadium: Crown Ground; Attendance: 1,362

1 February 2011 25	Accrington Stanley	1–1	Morecambe	Accrington
19:45 GMT	Edwards 73' (pen.)	Report	Jevons 66'	Stadium: Crown Ground; Attendance: 1,675

5 February 2011 26	Stevenage	2–2	Accrington Stanley	Stevenage
15:00 GMT	Harrison 7'; Wilson 78'	Report	Gornell 88'; Procter 90'	Stadium: Broadhall Way; Attendance: 2,265

15 February 2011 27	Rotherham United	2–0	Accrington Stanley	Sheffield
19:45 GMT	Daley 58'; Le Fondre 90'	Report		Stadium: Don Valley Stadium; Attendance: 2,529

19 February 2011 28	Wycombe Wanderers	1–2	Accrington Stanley	High Wycombe
15:00 GMT	Rendell 52'	Report	Jacobson 43'; Edwards 82'	Stadium: Adams Park; Attendance: 3,747

22 February 2011 29	Accrington Stanley	3–2	Crewe Alexandra	Accrington
19:45 GMT	Barnett 12'; Craney 47'; McConville 75'	Report	Moore 8'; Artell 72'	Stadium: Crown Ground; Attendance: 1,356

26 February 2011 30	Accrington Stanley	1–0	Torquay United	Accrington
15:00 GMT	Craney 78'	Report	Ellis (red card) 45'	Stadium: Crown Ground; Attendance: 1,543

5 March 2011 31	Lincoln City	0–0	Accrington Stanley	Lincoln
15:00 GMT		Report		Stadium: Sincil Bank; Attendance: 2,868

8 March 2011 32	Accrington Stanley	3–0	Stockport County	Accrington
19:45 GMT	Hessey 28'; Edwards 35' (pen.), 42' (pen.)	Report		Stadium: Crown Ground; Attendance: 1,831

12 March 2011 33	Gillingham	3–1	Accrington Stanley	Gillingham
15:00 GMT	Barcham 2', 45'; McDonald 56'	Report	McConville 14'	Stadium: Priestfield Stadium; Attendance: 5,299

15 March 2011 34	Accrington Stanley	3–1	Burton Albion	Accrington
19:45 GMT	Edwards 43'; Craney 48'; Procter 67'	Report	Pearson 88'	Stadium: Crown Ground; Attendance: 1,445

19 March 2011 35	Accrington Stanley	3–0	Port Vale	Accrington
15:00 GMT	McConville 43'; Craney 86'; Procter 90'	Report	Rigg (red card) 80'	Stadium: Crown Ground; Attendance: 2,413

22 March 2011 36	Crewe Alexandra	0–0	Accrington Stanley	Crewe
19:45 GMT		Report		Stadium: Gresty Road; Attendance: 3,701

26 March 2011 37	Aldershot Town	1–1	Accrington Stanley	Aldershot
15:00 GMT	Jones 52'	Report	Boulding 17'	Stadium: Recreation Ground (Aldershot); Attendance: 2,555

30 March 2011 38	Accrington Stanley	4–0	Hereford United	Accrington
19:45 BST	Gornell 16', 56'; Ryan 43'; McConville 45'	Report		Stadium: Crown Ground; Attendance: 1,632

2 April 2011 39	Accrington Stanley	3–1	Northampton Town	Accrington
15:00 BST	Craney 16', 27'; McConville 35'	Report	Jacobs 67'	Stadium: Crown Ground; Attendance: 1,876

5 April 2011 40	Accrington Stanley	3–1	Southend United	Accrington
19:45 BST	Craney 10'; Gornell 80'; Edwards 84' (pen.)	Report	Hall 58'	Stadium: Crown Ground; Attendance: 2,222

8 April 2011 41	Macclesfield Town	2–2	Accrington Stanley	Macclesfield
19:45 BST	Bencherif 22'; Mukendi 90'; Tremarco (red card) 82'	Report	Procter 73'; Edwards 79' (pen.)	Stadium: Moss Rose; Attendance: 1,674

16 April 2011 42	Accrington Stanley	0–0	Oxford United	Accrington
15:00 BST		Report		Stadium: Crown Ground; Attendance: 2,066

23 April 2011 43	Accrington Stanley	3–0	Bradford City	Accrington
15:00 BST	Joyce 9'; Procter 16'; McConville 45'	Report		Stadium: Crown Ground; Attendance: 2,815

25 April 2011 44	Shrewsbury Town	0–0	Accrington Stanley	Shrewsbury
15:00 BST		Report		Stadium: New Meadow; Attendance: 7,038

30 April 2011 45	Accrington Stanley	3–1	Barnet	Accrington
15:00 BST	Ryan 4', 56', 66'	Report	Marshall 7'	Stadium: Crown Ground; Attendance: 2,764

7 May 2011 46	Burton Albion	1–1	Accrington Stanley	Burton upon Trent
15:00 BST	Penn 46'	Report	Winnard 84'	Stadium: Pirelli Stadium; Attendance: 3,491

==== Play Offs ====
15 May 2011	Stevenage	2–0	Accrington Stanley	Stevenage
18:30 BST	Long 24'; Byrom 45'	Report		Stadium: Broadhall Way; Attendance: 4,424; Referee: Roger East

20 May 2011	Accrington Stanley	0–1	Stevenage	Accrington
19:45 BST	Joe Jacobson (red card) 69'; Sean McConville (red card) 70'	Report	Chris Beardsley 90'	Stadium: Crown Ground; Attendance: 4,185; Referee: Russell Booth

=== FA Cup ===
Stanley went out of this year's FA Cup at Round 2 to fellow League Two side Port Vale. In Round 1, Stanley knocked out League One side Oldham Athletic in a giantkilling Lancashire derby.

6 Nov 2010 First round	Accrington Stanley	3–2	Oldham Athletic	Accrington
15:00 GMT	Putterill 8', 52'; Ryan 36'		Feeney 69'; Stephens 75' (pen.)	Stadium: Crown Ground; Attendance: 2,275

26 Nov 2010 Second round	Port Vale	1–0	Accrington Stanley	Burslem
19:45 GMT	J. Richards 24'			Stadium: Vale Park; Attendance: 4,016

=== Carling Cup ===
Stanley equalled their best ever performance in the League Cup by reaching round 2, a feat they previously achieved in 2006–07 & the previous season. They got that far by beating Championship side Doncaster Rovers away from home and after extra time. In Round 2 they played Premier League side Newcastle United competitively for the first time. The tie was also covered live by Sky Sports.

10 August 2010 First round	Doncaster Rovers	1–2 (a.e.t.)	Accrington Stanley	Doncaster
19:45 BST	Payne 47'		Turner 83'; Lindfield 93'	Stadium: Keepmoat Stadium; Attendance: 4,603

25 August 2010 Second round	Accrington Stanley	2–3	Newcastle United	Accrington
19:45 BST	Putterill 45'; Hessey 90'		R.Taylor 36'; Ameobi 48'; Løvenkrands 67'	Stadium: Crown Ground; Attendance: 4,098

=== Football League Trophy ===
Strangely Stanley were knocked out of the Football League Trophy without losing a match. After beating League One side Tranmere Rovers on penalties, Stanley were charged by The FA of fielding Ray Putterill who was unaware to Stanley, under a suspension from the previous season whilst playing for Halewood Town. With impending talks due and further rounds continuing, Stanley decided to withdraw from the competition with Tranmere taking their place.

31 August 2010 Northern Section First Round	Tranmere Rovers	1–1 (3–5 p)	Accrington Stanley	Birkenhead
19:00 BST	Showunmi 79'		Putterill 55'	Stadium: Prenton Park; Attendance: 2,020
	Penalties
	Fraughan (penalty scored); Showunmi (penalty missed); McGurk (penalty scored); Cresswell (penalty scored)		Joyce (penalty scored); Parkinson (penalty scored); Murphy (penalty scored); Edwards (penalty scored); Ryan (penalty scored)

== League data ==
=== League table ===
Pos	Team	Pld	W	D	L	GF	GA	GD	Pts	Promotion, qualification or relegation
3	Wycombe Wanderers (P)	46	22	14	10	69	50	+19	80	Promotion to League One
4	Shrewsbury Town	46	22	13	11	72	49	+23	79	Qualification to League Two play-offs
5	Accrington Stanley	46	18	19	9	73	55	+18	73	Qualification to League Two play-offs
6	Stevenage (O, P)	46	18	15	13	62	45	+17	69	Qualification to League Two play-offs
7	Torquay United	46	17	18	11	74	53	+21	68 (Note: Torquay United deducted one point and Hereford United deducted three points)	Qualification to League Two play-offs

Updated to match(es) played on 28 May 2011. Source: The Football League
Rules for classification: 1) points; 2) goal difference; 3) number of goals scored.
(O) Play-off winners; (P) Promoted

=== Results summary ===
Overall								Home						Away					
Pld	W	D	L	GF	GA	GD	Pts	W	D	L	GF	GA	GD	W	D	L	GF	GA	GD
46	18	19	9	73	55	+18	73	15	5	3	53	24	+29	3	14	6	20	31	−11

Last updated: 11 May 2011.
Source: BBC Sport

=== Results by round ===
Round	1	2	3	4	5	6	7	8	9	10	11	12	13	14	15	16	17	18	19	20	21	22	23	24	25	26	27	28	29	30	31	32	33	34	35	36	37	38	39	40	41	42	43	44	45	46
Ground	H	A	H	A	H	A	H	A	A	H	A	H	A	H	A	A	H	A	A	A	H	H	A	H	H	A	A	A	H	H	A	H	A	H	H	A	A	H	H	H	A	H	H	A	H	A
Result	D	D	W	D	D	D	W	L	D	W	L	L	D	L	L	D	W	D	L	W	D	W	W	L	D	D	L	W	W	W	D	W	L	W	W	D	D	W	W	W	D	D	W	D	W	D
Position			6	7	8	10	7	7	8	6	9	12	14	17	18	17	13	14	18	18	18	13	12	12	15	16	19	17	14	13	14	11	13	12	11	10	10	10	8	6	5	8	5	5	5	5

Updated to match(es) played on 8 May 2011. Source: Fixtures & Results
A = Away; H = Home; W = Win; D = Draw; L = Loss

== Statistics ==
=== Appearances, goals and cards ===
Updated 20 May 2011.
(Substitute appearances in brackets)

No.	Pos.	Name	League		FA Cup		League Cup		League Trophy		Play Offs		Total		Discipline	
No.	Pos.	Name	Apps	Goals	Apps	Goals	Apps	Goals	Apps	Goals	Apps	Goals	Apps	Goals	Yellow card	Red card
1	GK	(Australia) Alex Cisak	21	0	0	0	1	0	1	0	2	0	25	0	0	0
2	DF	(England) Jonathan Bateson	12	0	0	0	2	0	1	0	0	0	15	0	0	1
3	DF	(England) Dean Winnard	45	1	2	0	2	0	1	0	2	0	52	1	5	0
4	DF	(England) Sean Hessey	40 (1)	1	2	0	2	1	0	0	2	0	46 (1)	2	10	0
5	DF	(Republic of Ireland) Kevin Long	11 (4)	0	2	0	0	0	0	0	0	0	13 (4)	0	5	1
6	MF	(England) Andrew Procter	42 (1)	6	2	0	2	0	0	0	2	0	48 (1)	6	6	1
7	MF	(Republic of Ireland) Jimmy Ryan	45 (1)	9	1	1	2	0	2	0	2	0	52 (1)	10	7	0
8	FW	(England) Charlie Barnett	31 (9)	2	1	0	1	0	0	0	0	0	33 (9)	2	5	0
9	FW	(England) Craig Lindfield	2 (14)	0	0	0	1	1	1	0	0	0	4 (14)	1	0	0
10	MF	(England) Ray Putterill	11 (13)	0	2	2	2	1	1	1	0 (1)	0	16 (14)	4	2	0
11	MF	(England) Sean McConville	37 (6)	13	1	0	2	0	0	0	2	0	42 (6)	13	2	1
12	DF	(England) Phil Edwards	44	13	2	0	2	0	1	0	2	0	51	13	13	0
13	DF	(England) Leam Richardson	3 (8)	1	0 (1)	0	0	0	0 (1)	0	0	0	3 (10)	1	1	0
14	MF	(England) Luke Joyce	24 (3)	1	1	0	1	0	1	0	2	0	29 (3)	1	7	0
15	MF	(England) Andy Parkinson	10 (8)	2	1	0	1 (1)	0	1	0	0	0	13 (9)	2	0	0
16	MF	(England) Chris Turner	1 (14)	0	0 (1)	0	0 (2)	1	0 (1)	0	0 (1)	0	1 (19)	1	0	0
17	DF	(England) Peter Murphy	4 (7)	0	0	0	0 (1)	0	1	0	0	0	5 (8)	0	0	1
19	FW	(England) Rory Boulding	6 (9)	2	0 (1)	0	0	0	1	0	0	0	7 (10)	2	1	0
20	MF	(England) Alan Burton	1	0	0	0	0	0	0	0	0	0	1	0	0	0
22	DF	(England) Andy Owens	0 (3)	0	0	0	0	0	1	0	0	0	1 (3)	0	0	0
23	DF	(England) Tom Smyth	3 (1)	0	0	0	0	0	0 (1)	0	0	0	3 (2)	0	0	0
24	FW	(England) Terry Gornell	40	13	2	0	0	0	0	0	2	0	44	13	6	0
25	GK	(England) Ian Dunbavin	25	0	2	0	1	0	0	0	0	0	28	0	2	0
26	DF	(Wales) Joe Jacobson	26	2	1	0	0	0	0	0	2	0	29	2	5	1
27	MF	(England) Ian Craney	22	7	0	0	0	0	0	0	2	0	24	7	4	0

== Transfers ==
Players transferred in
Date	Pos.	Name	From	Fee	Ref.
4 June 2010	FW	(England) Craig Lindfield	(England) Macclesfield Town	Free	
4 June 2010	DF	(England) Michael Hall	(England) Blackburn Rovers	Free	
25 June 2010	DF	(Australia) Alex Cisak	(England) Leicester City	Free	
23 July 2010	MF	(England) Ray Putterill	(England) Halewood Town	Free	
23 July 2010	MF	(England) Andy Parkinson	(England) Gateshead	Free (released)	
27 July 2010	FW	(England) Rory Boulding	(England) Bradford City	Free (released)	
27 July 2010	DF	(England) Jonathan Bateson	(England) Bradford City	Free (released)	
3 August 2010	DF	(England) Sean Hessey	(England) Macclesfield Town	Free (released)	
3 August 2010	DF	(England) Charlie Barnett	(England) Tranmere Rovers	Free (released)	
19 August 2010	DF	(England) Andy Owens	(Wales) Rhyl	Free	
3 August 2010	DF	(England) Tom Smyth	(England) Preston North End	Free (released)	
27 August 2010	FW	(England) Terry Gornell	(England) Tranmere Rovers	Free	
31 January 2011	MF	(England) Ian Craney	(England) Fleetwood Town	Free	
31 January 2011	DF	(Wales) Joe Jacobson	(England) Oldham Athletic	Free	
Players loaned in
Date from	Pos.	Name	From	Date to	Ref.
15 October 2010	DF	(Republic of Ireland) Kevin Long	(England) Burnley	18 January 2011	
25 November 2010	DF	(Wales) Joe Jacobson	(England) Oldham Athletic	31 January 2011	
25 November 2010	MF	(England) Ian Craney	(England) Fleetwood Town	3 January 2011	
31 January 2011	DF	(Republic of Ireland) Kevin Long	(England) Burnley	End of season	
Players loaned out
Date from	Pos.	Name	To	Date to	Ref.
28 August 2010	DF	(England) Zak Riley	(England) Burscough	End of season	
26 November 2010	FW	(England) Craig Lindfield	(England) Kidderminster Harriers	26 December 2010	
26 November 2010	DF	(England) Tom Smyth	(England) Workington	28 January 2011	
22 February 2011	MF	(England) Alan Burton	(England) Marine	22 April 2011	
3 March 2011	DF	(England) Jonathan Bateson	(England) Altrincham	30 April 2011	
Players transferred out
Date	Pos.	Name	Subsequent club	Fee	Ref.
24 June 2010	FW	(England) Bobby Grant	(England) Scunthorpe United	£260,000	
Players released
Date	Pos.	Name	Subsequent club	Join date	Ref.
3 June 2010	DF	(England) Darran Kempson	(England) Grimsby Town	1 July 2010 (Bosman)	
4 June 2010	FW	(England) Michael Symes	(England) Bournemouth	1 July 2010 (Bosman)	
12 June 2010	FW	(England) Gary King	(England) Hinckley United	1 July 2010	
28 June 2010	FW	(England) John Miles	(England) Fleetwood Town	1 July 2010 (Bosman)	
1 July 2010	FW	(England) John Mullin	Unattached		
1 July 2010	FW	(England) Adam Black	(England) Alsager Town	28 July 2010	
11 February 2011	DF	(England) Michael Hall	(England) Lancaster City	12 February 2011	
