= 2009–10 Preston North End F.C. season =

English football club season

Preston North End
2009–10 season
- Chairman: Derek Shaw
- Manager: Darren Ferguson
- Stadium: Deepdale
- Football League Championship: 17th
- FA Cup: Third round
- League Cup: Third round
- Top goalscorer: League: Jon Parkin & Neil Mellor (10); All: Jon Parkin (13)
- Highest home attendance: 23,199 vs Chelsea (FA Cup, 23 January 2010)
- Lowest home attendance: 5,407 vs Morecambe (League Cup, 11 August 2009)
Home colours	Away colours	Third colours

The 2009–10 season is Preston North End's 6th season in the Championship. It is their 10th successive season in the second division of the English football league system.

== Players ==
=== First-team squad ===
Squad at end of season

Note: Flags indicate national team as defined under FIFA eligibility rules; some limited exceptions apply. Players may hold more than one non-FIFA nationality.

No.	Pos.	Nation	Player
1	GK	ENG	Andy Lonergan
2	DF	SCO	Michael Hart
3	DF	SCO	Callum Davidson
4	MF	ENG	Richard Chaplow
5	DF	FRA	Youl Mawéné
6	DF	SCO	Neill Collins
7	MF	ENG	Chris Sedgwick
8	MF	MKD	Veliče Šumulikoski
9	FW	ENG	Chris Brown
10	MF	SCO	Barry Nicholson
11	MF	ENG	Darren Carter
12	DF	IRL	Sean St Ledger (Note: St Ledger was born in Solihull, England, but also qualified to represent the Republic of Ireland internationally through his grandfather and made his international debut for the Republic of Ireland in May 2009.)
13	GK	ENG	Dominic Comrie
14	DF	ENG	Liam Chilvers
15	MF	SCO	Paul Coutts
16	MF	IRL	Keith Treacy
17	MF	WAL	Paul Parry
18	FW	ENG	Danny Welbeck (on loan from Manchester United)

No.	Pos.	Nation	Player
19	DF	ENG	Billy Jones
20	DF	CYP	Tom Williams (Note: Williams was born in Sutton, England, but also qualified to represent Cyprus internationally through his mother and made his international debut for Cyprus in 2006.) (on loan from Peterborough United)
22	GK	IRL	Wayne Henderson
23	MF	ENG	Matty James (on loan from Manchester United)
24	DF	ENG	Elliott Ward (on loan from Coventry City)
25	MF	SCO	Ross Wallace
26	FW	ENG	Jon Parkin
27	DF	IRL	Eddie Nolan
29	FW	IRL	Stephen Elliott
31	DF	ENG	Dom Collins
33	FW	ENG	Neil Mellor
34	MF	NIR	Adam Barton (Note: Barton was born in Clitheroe, England, but also qualified to represent Northern Ireland and the Republic of Ireland internationally through his parents and represented Northern Ireland at U-21 level before making his debut for Northern Ireland in November 2010 and then representing the Republic of Ireland at U-21 level.)
35	MF	ENG	Danny Mayor
36	FW	NIR	Neil Dougan
37	DF	NIR	Conor McLaughlin
38	FW	ENG	Jamie Proctor
39	MF	ENG	George Miller
40	DF	AUS	Bailey Wright

=== Left club during season ===
Note: Flags indicate national team as defined under FIFA eligibility rules; some limited exceptions apply. Players may hold more than one non-FIFA nationality.

No.	Pos.	Nation	Player
18	MF	ENG	Michael Tonge (on loan from Stoke City)
21	DF	ENG	Neal Trotman (on loan from Huddersfield Town)

No.	Pos.	Nation	Player
32	DF	ENG	Phil Quirk (released)
36	DF	ENG	Tom Smyth (released)

== League table ==
Pos	Team	Pld	W	D	L	GF	GA	GD	Pts
15	Ipswich Town	46	12	20	14	50	61	−11	56
16	Watford	46	14	12	20	61	68	−7	54
17	Preston North End	46	13	15	18	58	73	−15	54
18	Barnsley	46	14	12	20	53	69	−16	54
19	Coventry City	46	13	15	18	47	64	−17	54

Source: The Football League
Rules for classification: 1) points; 2) goal difference; 3) number of goals scored.

== Match results ==
=== Legend ===
Win	Draw	Loss

=== Pre-season friendlies ===
Date	Opponent	Venue	Result F–A	Scorers	Attendance	Ref.
11 July 2009	FC Erdal Hallien 04	A	11–0	Mellor 7', Brown 24', 32', 45', Mayor 52', 63', Nicholson 65', Parkin 74', 88', Trotman 77', Hawley 85'	N/A	
14 July 2009	Bamber Bridge	A	4–1	Parkin 26', Trotman 40', Trotman 40', Proctor 60', Smyth 63'	1,369	
14 July 2009	Chorley	A	3–0	Brown 54', Carter 72', Hawley 81'	N/A	
18 July 2009	Tranmere Rovers	A	2–1	Parkin 19', 50'	1,775	
21 July 2009	Wrexham	A	1–1	Chaplow 60'	1,022	
25 July 2009	Stoke City	H	2–1	Mellor 33', 44'	3,121	
28 July 2009	Wigan Athletic	H	1–4	Mellor 86'	3,645	
1 August 2009	Hibernian	A	3–1	Mellor 46', Brown 69', 81'	6,557	

=== Championship ===
Date	Opponent	Venue	Result F–A	Scorers	Attendance	Ref.
8 August 2009	Bristol City	H	2–2	Parkin 82', Davidson 90+6'	13,025	
15 August 2009	Doncaster Rovers	A	1–1	Brown 28',	10,070	
18 August 2009	Barnsley	A	3–0	Parry 11', Mellor 32', Parkin 72'	11,850	
22 August 2009	Peterborough United	H	2–0	Mellor 8', Jones 30'	11,549	
29 August 2009	Ipswich Town	A	1–1	Wallace 12'	19,454	
12 September 2009	Swansea City	H	2–0	Mellor 27', Elliott 89'	12,854	
15 September 2009	Scunthorpe United	A	1–3	Parkin 58'	5,383	
19 September 2009	Coventry City	H	3–2	Brown (2) 50', 68', Mellor 55',	11,230	
26 September 2009	Leicester City	A	2–1	Mellor 41', Chaplow 66'	20,623	
29 September 2009	Reading	H	1–2	Parkin85'	10,987	
3 October 2009	West Bromwich Albion	H	0–0		12,489	
17 October 2009	QPR	A	0–4		12,810	
20 October 2009	Sheffield Wednesday	A	2–1	Mellor 20', Parkin 55'	20,882	
24 October 2009	Middlesbrough	H	2–2	Parry 61', Jones 90'	16,116	
31 October 2009	Crystal Palace	H	1–1	Wallace 35'	12,558	
07 November 2009	Watford	A	0-2		13,524	
23 November 2009	Newcastle United	H	0-1		16,924	
30 November 2009	Blackpool	A	1-1	Wallace 38'	9,861	
05 December 2009	Cardiff City	A	0-1		18,735	
08 December 2009	Derby County	H	0-0		11,755	
12 December 2009	Plymouth Argyle	H	2-0	Chaplow 10', Wallace 26'	12,231	
19 December 2009	Nottingham Forest	A	0-3		21,582	
28 December 2009	Sheffield United	A	0-1		25,231	
16 January 2010	Bristol City	A	2-4	Brown 10', Wallace 90+2'	13,146	
28 January 2010	Peterborough United	A	1-0	Mellor 34'	7,134	
30 January 2010	Ipswich Town	H	2-0	Collins 64', Wellbeck 84'	12,087	
02 February 2010	Barnsley	H	1-4	Wellbeck 27'	12,453	
06 February 2010	Swansea City	A	0-2		14,659	
09 February 2010	Sheffield United	H	2-1	James 10', Parkin 71'	10,270	
13 February 2010	Blackpool	H	0-0		19,840	
16 February 2010	Derby County	A	3-5	Parkin 10', Sedgwick 62', Brown 90+2'	26,993	
20 February 2010	Newcastle United	A	0-3		45,525	
27 February 2010	Cardiff City	H	3-0	Parkin (2) 30', 54', Brown 86'	11,777	
06 March 2010	Plymouth Argyle	A	1-1	St Ledger 18'	9,582	
09 March 2010	Doncaster Rovers	H	1-1	Mellor 42'	11,942	
13 March 2010	Nottingham Forest	H	3-2	Wallace 20', Davidson 29', James 32'	14,426	
16 March 2010	Sheffield Wednesday	H	2-2	Mellor 29', Coutts 53'	12,311	
20 March 2010	West Bromwich Albion	A	2-3	St Ledger 15', Mellor 43'	21,343	
23 March 2010	Middlesbrough	A	0-2		16,974	
27 March 2010	Queens Park Rangers	H	2-2	Jones 37', Davidson 56'	12,080	
03 April 2010	Watford	H	1-1	Davidson 53'	12,534	
05 April 2010	Crystal Palace	A	1-3	Treacy 8'	16,642	
10 April 2010	Scunthorpe United	H	3-2	Parkin 28', Jones 86', Treacy 90+3'	12,441	
17 April 2010	Coventry City	A	1-1	Davidson 37'	15,822	
24 April 2010	Leicester City	H	0-1		14,926	
02 May 2010	Reading	A	1-4	Wallace 64'	19,239	

=== FA Cup ===
Round	Date	Opponent	Venue	Result F–A	Scorers	Attendance	Ref.
Third round	02 January 2010	Colchester United	H	7-0	Brown '13, Sedgwick '27, Parkin (3) 48', 50', 72', Williams (og) 52', Carter '64	7,621	
Fourth round	23 January 2010	Chelsea	H	0-2		23,119	

=== League Cup ===
Round	Date	Opponent	Venue	Result F–A	Scorers	Attendance	Ref.
First round	11 August 2009	Morecambe	H	5–1	Brown 33', Elliott 45', Nicholson 57', Trotman 69', Mellor 90'	5,407	
Second round	25 August 2009	Leicester City	H	2–1	Brown (2) 14', 65'	6,977	
Third round	23 September 2009	Tottenham Hotspur	H	1–5	Brown 83'	16,533	

== Transfers ==
=== In ===
Date	Player	Previous club	Cost
3 August 2009	(Wales) Paul Parry	Cardiff City	Undisclosed
6 August 2009	(North Macedonia) Veliče Šumulikoski	Ipswich Town	Undisclosed
1 September 2009	(Scotland) Neill Collins	Wolverhampton Wanderers	On loan until January 2010
1 February 2010	(Republic of Ireland) Keith Treacy	Blackburn Rovers	Undisclosed
1 February 2010	(Scotland) Paul Coutts	Peterborough United	Undisclosed
			Total
			Around £650-700k

=== Out ===
Date	Player	New Club	Cost
13 May 2009	(England) Andrew Murphy	Chester City	Free Transfer
2 July 2009	(England) Chris Neal	Shrewsbury Town	Nominal Fee
20 July 2009	(England) Paul McKenna	Nottingham Forest	£750,000
24 July 2009	(England) Simon Whaley	Norwich City	Undisclosed
3 August 2009	(England) Karl Hawley	Notts County	Undisclosed
			Total
			Around £1,000,000

=== Loaned out ===
Date	Player	Club	Return Date
21 August 2009	(England) Neal Trotman	Southampton	January 2010
1 September 2009	(England) Adam Barton	Crawley Town	29 September 2010
1 September 2009	(England) Dominic Collins	Crawley Town	29 September 2010
15 September 2009	(Republic of Ireland) Sean St Ledger	Middlesbrough	15 December 2009

== Player statistics ==
No.	Pos.	Nationality	Player	FLC	FA	CC	Total	Goal	Ast
1	GK	England	Andrew Lonergan	5	0	3	7	0	0	1	0
2	DF	Scotland	Michael Hart	1	0	3	3	0	1	0	0
3	DF	Scotland	Callum Davidson	5	0	0	5	1	0	2	1
4	MF	England	Richard Chaplow	4	0	2	5	0	0	1	0
5	DF	France	Youl Mawene	2	0	2	3	0	0	2	0
7	MF	England	Chris Sedgwick	4	0	2	6	0	1	0	0
8	MF	(North Macedonia) Macedonia	Veliče Šumulikoski	3	0	2	4	0	2	0	0
9	FW	England	Chris Brown	5	0	3	7	4	0	0	0
10	MF	Scotland	Barry Nicholson	3	0	1	4	1	1	1	0
11	MF	England	Darren Carter	3	0	3	5	0	0	1	0
12	DF	(Republic of Ireland) Ireland	Sean St Ledger	5	0	1	6	0	0	1	0
14	DF	England	Liam Chilvers	4	0	3	6	0	0	1	0
17	MF	Wales	Paul Parry	5	0	2	7	1	1	0	0
19	DF	England	Billy Jones	5	0	2	6	1	2	0	0
21	DF	England	Neal Trotman	0	0	1	1	1	1	0	0
22	GK	(Republic of Ireland) Ireland	Wayne Henderson	0	0	0	0	0	0	0	0
25	MF	Scotland	Ross Wallace	5	0	2	6	1	3	1	0
26	FW	England	Jon Parkin	5	0	1	5	2	0	0	0
27	DF	(Republic of Ireland) Ireland	Eddie Nolan	1	0	2	2	0	1	0	0
29	FW	(Republic of Ireland) Ireland	Stephen Elliott	1	0	3	3	1	0	0	0
33	FW	England	Neil Mellor	3	0	3	5	3	1	0	0
40	MF	England	Adam Barton	0	0	0	0	0	0	0	0
54	MF	England	Nicholas Farr	0	0	0	0	0	0	0	0
No.	Pos.	Nationality	Player	PL	FA	CC	Total	Goal	Ast

- Last Update: 30 August 2009
- Data includes all competitions
- Substitution appearances included as full
- FLC – Football League Championship
- FA – FA Cup
- CC – Carling Cup
- Ast – Assists

=== Top scorer ===
As of 29 August 2009

P.	Player	Position	Championship	FA Cup	League Cup	Total
1	(England) Jon Parkin	Forward	10	3	0	13
2	(England) Neil Mellor	Forward	10	0	1	11
3	(England) Chris Brown	Forward	6	1	4	11
4	(Scotland) Ross Wallace	Midfielder	7	0	0	7
5	(Scotland) Callum Davidson	Defender	5	0	0	5
6	(England) Billy Jones	Defender	4	0	0	4
