= Ray Putterill =

English footballer

Personal information
- Full name: Raymond Francis Putterill
- Date of birth: 3 February 1989 (age 37)
- Place of birth: Wirral, England
- Height: 5 ft 8 in (1.73 m)
- Position: Midfielder

Youth career
- 2005–2007: Liverpool

Senior career*
Years	Team	Apps	(Gls)
2007–2009	Liverpool	0	(0)
2009–2010	Halewood Town	?	(?)
2010–2011	Accrington Stanley	24	(12)
2011–2012	Southport	2	(3)
2011–2012	→ Vauxhall Motors (loan)	0	(8)
2011–2012	Essemmay OB		
2012–2013	Rochdale	22	(2)
2013	Hyde	1	(0)
2013	Waterloo Dock		
2013–2014	Formby	1	(0)
2014–2015	Waterloo Dock		
2016	Marine	2	(0)
2016	Aigburth Peoples Hall		

International career
2004	England U16	2	(0)
- * Club domestic league appearances and goals

Raymond Francis Putterill (born 3 February 1989) is an English former footballer.

== Club career ==
=== Liverpool ===
Putterill started his career at Liverpool working his way through their youth teams and moving up to the Liverpool Academy in the summer of 2005. In April 2007 he was in the team that lifted the 2007 FA Youth Cup for Liverpool. He was given a senior contract in the summer of 2007 and made one first team appearance against Crewe Alexandra in pre-season during July 2007 in a friendly match, when he scored. He was awarded the number 35 shirt at Liverpool for the 2007–08 season and was named on the bench for the first time in a Football League Cup tie against Reading in September 2007. He was unable to break into the first team and failure to prove his fitness after a hip operation resulted in his release from Liverpool at the end of the 2008–09 season.

His nickname is 'Razor' both in relation to his 1st name 'Ray' and also his aggressive playing style much like former Liverpool player 'Razor Ruddock'.

=== Halewood Town ===
He joined Liverpool County Premier League team Halewood Town around October 2009, playing between 15 and 20 games for the side.

=== Accrington Stanley ===
After seven operations throughout his career including a fractured spine, a hip reconstruction, cartilage in his knee, a hernia operation and a fractured spine when playing for England Schoolboys, the under 15s, against Ireland, in July 2010 he signed for League two club Accrington Stanley on a six-month contract. He made his league debut on 7 August 2010 in the opening match of the season against Aldershot and scored his first goal for the club on 25 August 2010 in a League Cup tie against Newcastle United.

In September 2010, both Putterill and Accrington Stanley were charged by the Football Association after the midfielder played whilst under a 42-day Liverpool County FA suspension. This related to an incident whilst playing for Halewood in April 2010 where he had been found guilty of improper or insulting behaviour, after swearing at the referee. The ban came into effect from 30 August 2010 and it was thought that playing Putterill may lead to Stanley being expelled from the Football League Trophy. On 13 October 2010 Stanley withdrew from the competition and Tranmere were reinstated. He returned from this ban in a League Two match on 16 October 2010 as a late substitute in Stanley's match against Rotherham.

Though no official announcement was made, his fitness levels were a concern and as a result he was not offered a contract by Accrington Stanley for the 2011–12 season.

=== Southport ===
On his 23rd birthday, Putterill signed for Conference National team Southport In just his second match for the club he was sent off for foul and abusive language.

On his return from suspension he joined Vauxhall Motors on loan until the end of the season, but failed to make a single first team appearance.

=== Rochdale ===
On 9 August Putterill signed for League 2 Team Rochdale on a non-contract basis. He scored his first Football League goal on 25 August. On 14 January 2013 Ray Putterill was released by the club along with fellow Dale player Ian Craney.

=== Hyde ===
On 22 January 2013 Putterill signed a permanent deal with Conference Premier team Hyde. He was released at the end of his contract after making only one first-team appearance.

=== Waterloo Dock ===
He then played for Waterloo Dock.

=== Formby ===
Over the summer of 2013 he signed for North West Counties Football League Division One side Formby, making his debut in the opening game of the season.

=== Marine ===
In February 2016 he joined Marine making two league appearances for the club.

== Honours ==
- FA Youth Cup: 2007 with Liverpool

== Career statistics ==
Appearances and goals by club, season and competition
Club	Season	League		Cup		League Cup		Europe		Other		Total	
Club	Season	Apps	Goals	Apps	Goals	Apps	Goals	Apps	Goals	Apps	Goals	Apps	Goals
Accrington Stanley	2010–11	24	0	2	2	2	1	0	0	2	1	30	4
Southport	2011–12	2	0	0	0	0	0	0	0	0	0	2	0
Vauxhall Motors	2011–12	0	0	0	0	0	0	0	0	0	0	0	0
Rochdale	2012–13	18	1	1	0	1	0	0	0	2	1	20	2
Hyde	2012–13	1	0	0	0	0	0	0	0	0	0	1	0
Formby	2013–14	1	0	0	0	0	0	0	0	0	0	1	0
Marine	2015–16	2	0	0	0	0	0	0	0	0	0	2	0
Career total		48	1	3	2	3	1	0	0	4	1	56	6
