= Jonathan Bateson =

English footballer

Personal information
- Full name: Jonathan Alan Bateson
- Date of birth: 20 September 1989 (age 37)
- Place of birth: Preston, England
- Height: 6 ft 1 in (1.85 m)
- Position: Right back

Youth career
- 2006–2008: Blackburn Rovers

Senior career*
Years	Team	Apps	(Gls)
2008–2009	Blackburn Rovers	0	(0)
2008–2009	→ Buxton (loan)		
2009–2010	Bradford City	21	(0)
2010–2011	Accrington Stanley	12	(0)
2011	→ Altrincham (loan)	9	(0)
2011–2012	Macclesfield Town	21	(0)
2012	Ross County	0	(0)
Total		63	(0)
- * Club domestic league appearances and goals

Jonathan Alan Bateson (born 20 September 1989) is an English former professional footballer who played as a right back.

== Career ==
=== Blackburn Rovers ===
Born in Preston, Lancashire, Bateson began his career in the youth team of Blackburn Rovers. During the 2007–08 season, Bateson undertook a cartilage operation which disrupted his season. But he recovered and returned to playing for the club’s reserve side. At the end of the season he signed a new contract with Blackburn.

On 22 December 2008, Bateson signed on loan for Buxton. At the end of the 2008–09 season, he was released by Blackburn.

=== Bradford City ===
On 7 April 2009, Bateson went on trial with Bradford City. He was offered a one-year contract by the club following the trial. Upon joining the club, he was given a number sixteen shirt.

Bateson made his debut for Bradford on 12 August 2009, in a 3–0 loss against Nottingham Forest, in the League Cup, being sent off for a tackle on Nathan Tyson. After the match, manager Stuart McCall defended Bateson, He later made his Football League debut for the club, coming on as a late substitute in a 2–1 win against Shrewsbury Town on 5 September 2009. After joining the club, Bateson was a cover for first-choice right–back Simon Ramsden.

Following Ramsden's return from injury, both players competed for a starting place. He later suffered an illness that ruled him out for the remainder of the 2009–10 season.

Bateson was released from his contract with Bradford City at the end of the 2009–10 season,

=== Accrington Stanley ===
After leaving Bradford City, Bateson went on trial at Accrington Stanley. The trial was successful and he signed for the club.

Bateson made his debut for Accrington in a 0–0 draw against Aldershot Town in the opening game of the season. After joining the club, he became a firs- team regular, playing in the right–back position throughout September and early–October.

On 3 March 2011, Bateson joined Conference National side Altrincham on a one-month loan deal. Two days later on 5 March 2011, he made his debut for the club, starting the whole game, in a 1–1 draw against Gateshead. On 1 April 2011, his loan spell with the club was later extended until the end of that month. However, he later suffered a knee injury that ruled him out for the rest of the season. After returning to Accrington at the end of his loan spell on 30 April 2011, the club announced on 23 May 2011 that Bateson would not be offered a new contract at the end of the 2010–11 season.

=== Macclesfield Town ===
On 24 June 2011, Bateson signed for Macclesfield Town on a one–year contract.

He made his debut for the club, starting the whole game, in a 1–0 loss against Dagenham & Redbridge in the opening game of the season.

On 21 May 2012, Macclesfield released twenty-one players, including Bateson.

=== Ross County ===
Bateson moved to Scotland on 24 July 2012, signing for Ross County.

He made his debut for the club in a 4–1 loss against Raith Rovers in the second round of the Scottish League Cup. On 21 December 2012, Bateson was released by Ross County.

== Career statistics ==
As of 6 April 2013

Club	Season	League		FA Cup		League Cup		Other		Total	
Club	Season	Apps	Goals	Apps	Goals	Apps	Goals	Apps	Goals	Apps	Goals
Bradford City	2009–10	21	0	1	0	1	0	4	0	27	0
Accrington Stanley	2010–11	12	0	0	0	2	0	1	0	15	0
Altrincham (loan)	2010–11	9	0	0	0	0	0	0	0	9	0
Macclesfield Town	2011–12	21	0	5	0	1	0	1	0	28	0
Ross County	2012–13	0	0	0	0	1	0	0	0	1	0
Career total		63	0	6	0	5	0	6	0	80	0
