= Danny Welbeck =

English footballer (born 1990)

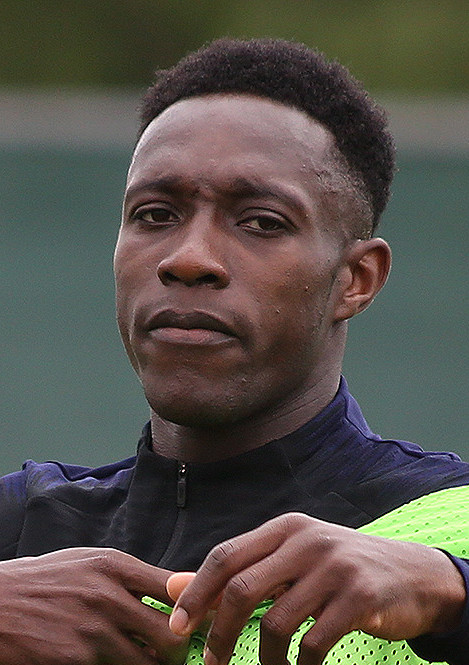
- Welbeck training with England at the 2018 FIFA World Cup

Personal information
- Full name: Daniel Nii Tackie Mensah Welbeck
- Date of birth: 26 November 1990 (age 35)
- Place of birth: Manchester, England
- Height: 6 ft 1 in (1.85 m)
- Position: Forward

Team information
- Current team: Chelsea
- Number: 18

Youth career
- 2001–2008: Manchester United

Senior career*
Years	Team	Apps	(Gls)
2008–2014	Manchester United	92	(20)
2010	→ Preston North End (loan)	8	(2)
2010–2011	→ Sunderland (loan)	26	(6)
2014–2019	Arsenal	88	(16)
2019–2020	Watford	18	(2)
2020–2026	Brighton & Hove Albion	176	(46)
2026–	Chelsea	9	(0)

International career
2005	England U16	1	(0)
2006–2007	England U17	15	(4)
2007–2008	England U18	2	(2)
2008–2009	England U19	10	(2)
2009–2011	England U21	14	(5)
2011–2018	England	42	(16)
- * Club domestic league appearances and goals as of 17:41, 21 November 2026 (UTC)

Daniel Nii Tackie Mensah Welbeck (born 26 November 1990) is an English professional footballer who plays as a forward for Premier League club Chelsea.

Welbeck made his way through the youth teams at Manchester United before making his senior debut in 2008 and scoring in the process. He was with United when they won the 2008–09 League Cup and the 2008 FIFA Club World Cup before being sent on loan spells with Preston North End and Sunderland. From the 2011–12 season, Welbeck was a regular figure in the Manchester United first team. He was transferred to Arsenal in September 2014 for a £16 million fee. In August 2019, Welbeck joined Watford, following his release by Arsenal at the end of the previous season, before joining Brighton & Hove Albion a year later. He has since become Brighton's all-time top scorer in the Premier League.

Welbeck made his debut for the England national team in March 2011 in a 1–1 friendly draw against Ghana. He scored his first senior international goal on 2 June 2012, the only goal in a friendly victory over Belgium. Welbeck has gone on to represent England at UEFA Euro 2012, the 2014 FIFA World Cup and the 2018 FIFA World Cup, earning 42 caps.

== Early life ==
Daniel Nii Tackie Mensah Welbeck was born on 26 November 1990 in Manchester, to parents from Ghana, and was raised in the Longsight area of the city.

== Club career ==
=== Manchester United ===
Welbeck was first spotted by Manchester United as a six-year-old. At eight years old, he impressed with local team Fletcher Moss Rangers, and was finally picked up by the Manchester United youth academy. He joined United during the 2005–06 season, making his debut for the club's under-18 team on 8 April 2006 in a league match against Sunderland. He then came on as a substitute in the next match, before being named as an unused substitute in the team's last two matches of the season. The following season, he made a further 28 appearances for the under-18s, scoring nine goals, including eight appearances and one goal in the FA Youth Cup, in which he helped the team to reach the final, despite being two years younger than some of the other players. He was not handicapped despite suffering from Osgood–Schlatter disease, and was making rapid progress, despite his pneumonia.

Welbeck signed his first trainee contract in July 2007, and started the 2007–08 season in the under-18 team, but was quickly promoted to the reserve team, making a number of substitute appearances. Then, in January 2008, he was called up to the first team for the trip to Saudi Arabia to play Al-Hilal in Sami Al-Jaber's testimonial match. Welbeck made his debut in that match on 21 January 2008, coming on as a 65th-minute substitute for Anderson. Welbeck had the chance to snatch a draw for United when he was brought down in the penalty area in the final minute, but he put the penalty kick over the bar.

He joined the first-team squad partway through the 2007–08 season, and made his competitive debut for the Manchester United first team on 23 September 2008, starting up front in a 3–1 home win against Middlesbrough in the League Cup Third Round. Welbeck's Premier League debut was made on 15 November 2008, coming on as a 63rd-minute substitute for Park Ji-sung against Stoke City. He marked his debut with a curling 30-yard shot into the top right corner for United's fourth goal in a 5–0 win. He started in the 2009 League Cup Final at Wembley Stadium on 1 March 2009, in which United beat Tottenham Hotspur 4–1 on penalties after a 0–0 extra-time draw.

On 23 September 2009, Welbeck scored his first goal of the 2009–10 season, the only one of the match in the League Cup Third Round against Wolverhampton Wanderers. Welbeck made his UEFA Champions League debut in a 1–0 home defeat to Beşiktaş in November 2009. The following month he signed a new contract, keeping him at Manchester United until 2013.

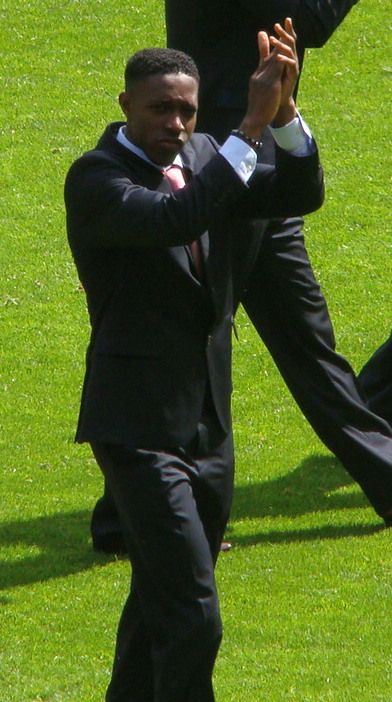
Welbeck with Sunderland in 2011

On 25 January 2010, Welbeck became Alex Ferguson's son Darren Ferguson's first signing as Preston North End manager since he took charge earlier in the month, signing on loan for the remainder of the 2009–10 season. As part of his recovery, he took part in a training session at Manchester United's training ground, but his knee swelled up again. The injury required surgery and Welbeck's loan was cut short on 16 March so that he could return to Manchester United for the operation.

On 12 August 2010, Welbeck became Steve Bruce's eighth summer signing after Sunderland signed the United striker on loan for the duration of the 2010–11 season. His debut for Sunderland came on 14 August as an 83rd-minute substitute for Darren Bent in a 2–2 home draw against Birmingham City. On 14 November, Welbeck scored his first Sunderland goal as he completed the scoring in a 3–0 away victory over Chelsea, rounding off what was described as an "impressive individual performance". Eight days later, Welbeck scored his first home goals for Sunderland, striking twice in a 2–2 draw with Everton.

Welbeck scored the only goal as Sunderland beat Bolton Wanderers on 18 December 2010, and also scored on 1 January 2011 as Sunderland defeated Blackburn Rovers 3–0. His form for Sunderland prompted widespread calls for an England call up, but on 5 January, he picked up a hamstring injury in a victory at Aston Villa, ruling him out for eight weeks. He made his return on 5 March 2011, in a 0–0 draw away to Arsenal, coming on as a substitute for Steed Malbranque in the 68th minute; he almost scored a late goal that would have won the match for Sunderland in the 83rd minute, but his shot was saved by Wojciech Szczęsny. He picked up an injury in the 4–2 home win over Wigan Athletic on 23 April, and he returned to Manchester United for treatment for the remainder of the season.

Welbeck was given a starting berth in the 2011 FA Community Shield match at Wembley Stadium on 7 August 2011. United won the match 3–2, having trailed rivals Manchester City 2–0 at half time. He started alongside Wayne Rooney in the first league match of the 2011–12 Premier League season away to West Bromwich Albion; he was substituted in the 65th minute, to be replaced by Dimitar Berbatov. On 22 August, Welbeck scored the opening goal of the match against Tottenham Hotspur, heading in a cross from Tom Cleverley from nine yards to score in the 61st minute. He then provided an assist for Anderson in the 76th minute to make the score 2–0 before being substituted. The match ended in a 3–0 win for United. Welbeck opened the scoring in an eventual 8–2 win over Arsenal. From outside the box, Anderson chipped the ball into Welbeck and he headed it over Wojciech Szczęsny. However, Welbeck had to leave the field early with a pulled hamstring which, consequently, ruled him out for several weeks.

Welbeck scored twice in a Champions League group match against Basel on 27 September; the match ended 3–3. Welbeck scored again in the next match, a 2–0 home win over Norwich City, after coming on as a second-half substitute. He exchanged passes with Park Ji-sung before sweeping low into the bottom corner to seal the win. On 21 December 2011, Welbeck opened the scoring at Craven Cottage in a 5–0 win against Fulham. He met Nani's cross and steered the ball in with his left foot. On 8 January 2012, Welbeck scored the second goal in a 3–2 away victory against Manchester City at the City of Manchester Stadium in the FA Cup third round. Patrice Evra made a half-cleared cross, which Welbeck volleyed into Costel Pantilimon's bottom corner. On 14 January, it was reported that Welbeck would sign a long-term contract at Old Trafford. On 22 January, Welbeck scored the winning goal in the 81st minute in a 2–1 away victory at the Emirates Stadium over Arsenal—his third goal in three matches. His impressive performances throughout the 2011–12 campaign earned him a place on the shortlist for the 2012 PFA Young Player of the Year Award, which was won by Tottenham Hotspur defender Kyle Walker.

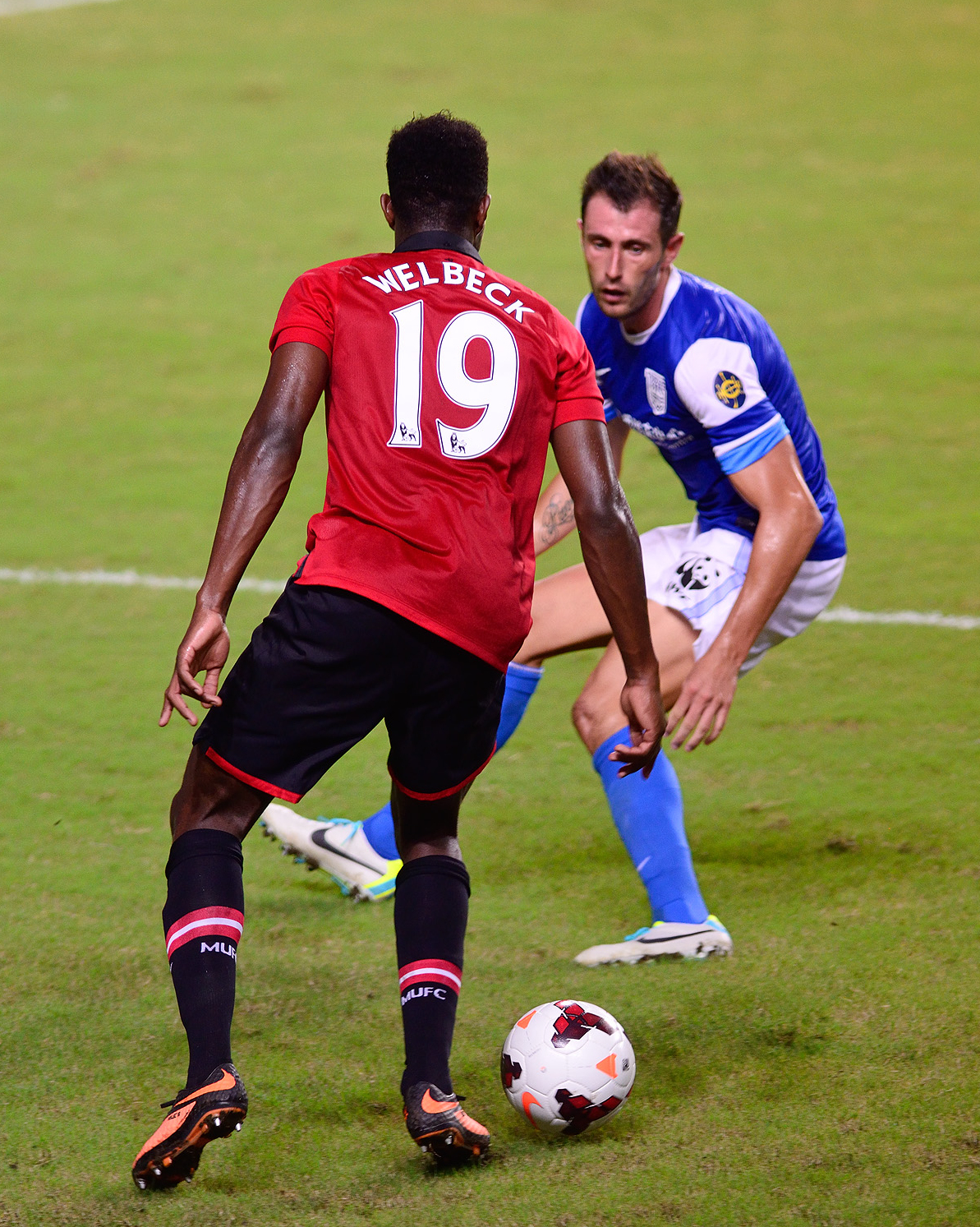
Welbeck (left) playing for Manchester United in 2013

Welbeck started the first match of the season against Everton on 20 August 2012, which ended a 1–0 defeat. He was substituted for the club's new signing, Robin van Persie. On 22 August 2012, Welbeck signed a new four-year contract with Manchester United stating that playing for Manchester United is all he ever wanted. He scored his first goal of the season on 20 October, in a 4–2 win at home to Stoke City. On 13 February 2013, Welbeck scored a vital goal in a 1–1 draw against Real Madrid at the Santiago Bernabéu Stadium, heading in from a Wayne Rooney corner, his first goal in almost four months. Welbeck's goal made him the first Englishman to score for a Premier League team at the Bernabéu since Leeds United's Alan Smith in 2001. He ended the season with a total of two goals in 40 appearances.

Welbeck started for United in their 2–0 win over Wigan Athletic in the 2013 FA Community Shield at Wembley Stadium on 11 August. He scored on the opening day of the Premier League season, scoring twice in a 4–1 win against Swansea City in new manager David Moyes' first league match as Manchester United manager. On 2 October 2013, he scored his only UEFA Champions League goal of the season in a 1–1 draw with Shakhtar Donetsk at the Donbas Arena.

Between December 2013 and January 2014, Welbeck scored six goals in six Premier League matches. On 15 December, he scored twice in a 3–0 win against Aston Villa at Villa Park. On 21 December, he scored his first goal at Old Trafford since October 2012 in a 3–1 win over West Ham United. On 28 December, he scored the only goal in United's win at Norwich City. He then scored in home matches against Tottenham Hotspur and Swansea City in January 2014.

On 9 March, Welbeck scored his tenth goal of the season in a 3–0 win at West Bromwich Albion. At the end of the season, Welbeck declared his intention to leave United to play as a striker elsewhere after what he described as his unhappiest season, stating: "I've been playing on the left for a while and it's got to the time when I want to stake a place up front".

=== Arsenal ===
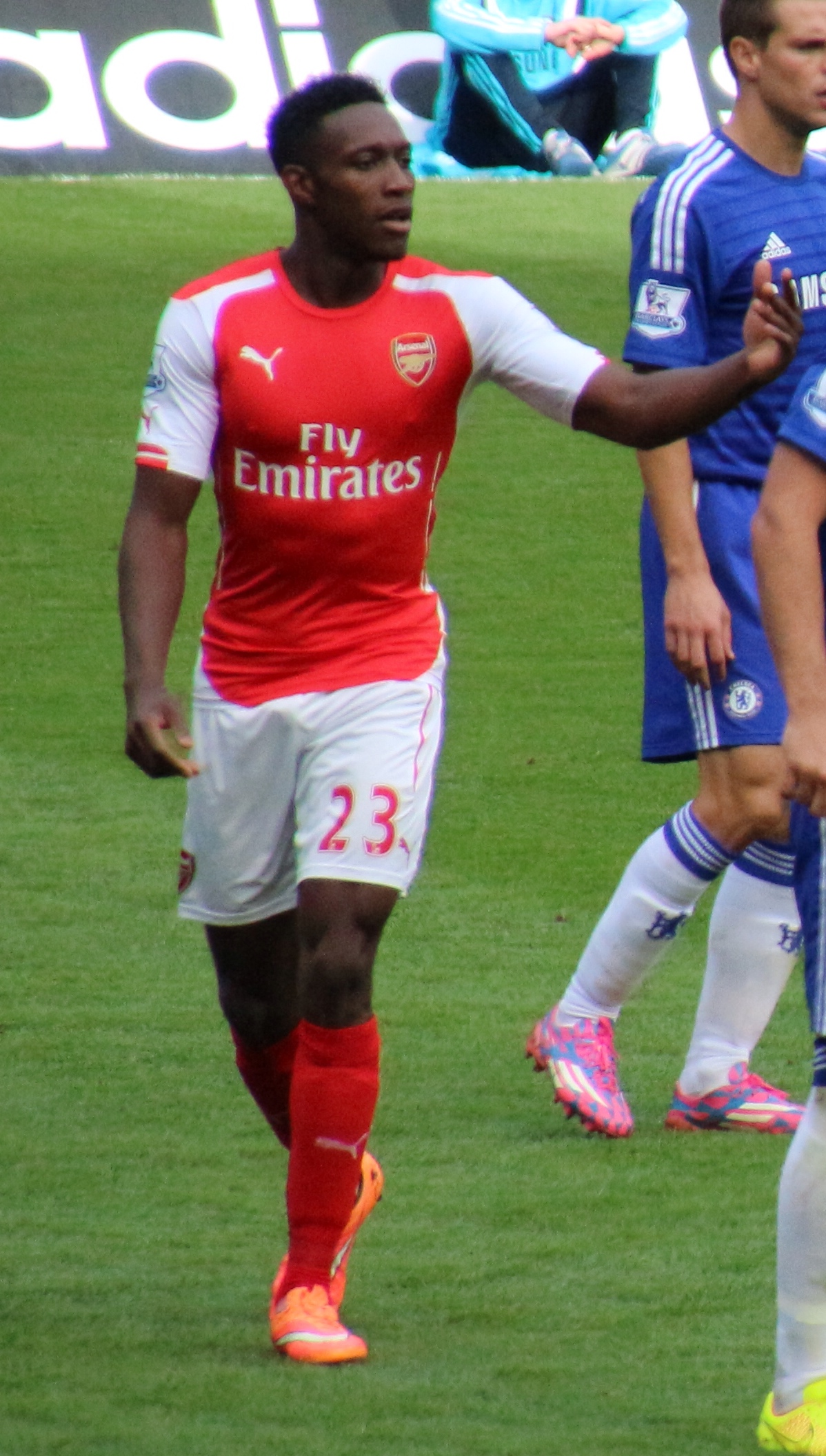
Welbeck playing for Arsenal in 2014

On 2 September 2014, in the late hours of deadline day, Welbeck joined Arsenal on a "long-term deal" for a £16 million fee. Stating the reason for his departure to a direct rival, Manchester United manager Louis van Gaal said "Welbeck doesn't have the record of Robin van Persie or Wayne Rooney. We let him go because of Falcao, but also to allow the youngsters to fit in. That is the policy. That is why I am here." Welbeck left Manchester United having made a total of 142 appearances, scoring 29 goals.

Welbeck made his Arsenal debut against the previous season's champions Manchester City at the Emirates Stadium in a 2–2 draw on 13 September. Following his first two appearances for Arsenal, manager Arsène Wenger urged fans to be patient, saying: "Danny will improve—we don't have to make a problem of that. We have to be patient with him". Welbeck scored his first Arsenal goal against Aston Villa in a 3–0 win on 20 September, and also set up a goal for Mesut Özil. On 1 October, he scored a UEFA Champions League hat-trick—the first treble of his professional career—against Galatasaray in a 4–1 victory.

On 9 March 2015, Welbeck scored the winning goal to knock out his former team, Manchester United, in the quarter-finals of the FA Cup at Old Trafford. The following month, he was ruled out for the rest of the campaign with injury, missing the Gunners' victory in the 2015 FA Cup Final.

Welbeck missed the opening weeks of his second season at Arsenal through injury, with it being announced that he would be out until Christmas with a knee injury. Around the time that he was expected to return, it was instead confirmed that he would be out until February 2016 at the earliest. Welbeck made his return on 14 February 2016 in a 2–1 win over league-leaders Leicester City as an 83rd-minute substitute, replacing Alex Oxlade-Chamberlain. He announced his return by heading in an injury time winner from a Mesut Özil free-kick. Welbeck scored in his first Premier League start of the season, Arsenal's first in a 3–2 defeat at former team Manchester United.

Welbeck then scored in consecutive domestic matches, a 2–1 home defeat in the FA Cup against Watford, then in a 2–0 win at Everton, ending a run of three matches of without a league win. In May, Welbeck sustained another knee injury in a 2–2 draw with Manchester City from which it was estimated he would miss between three and five months of football, thereby ending any chance he had of making England's UEFA Euro 2016 squad. It was subsequently announced that he would be out of action for nine months.

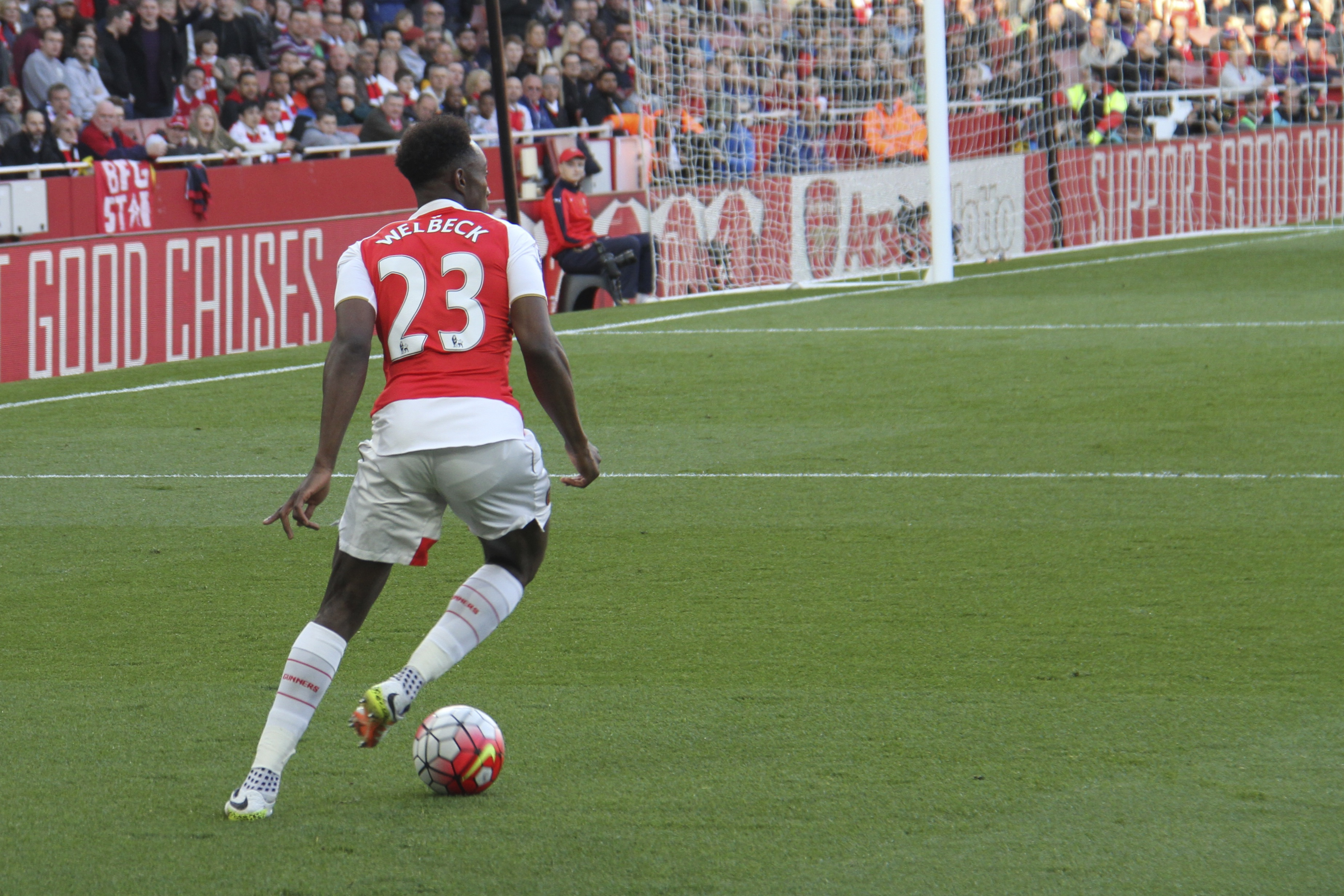
Welbeck playing for Arsenal in 2016

After being away for eight months due to the knee injury, Welbeck was named part of Arsenal's squad in the FA Cup match against his former club Preston on 7 January 2017. He started on the bench and entered the fray with seven minutes remaining in what was a 2–1 win for Arsenal, after Olivier Giroud scored late to give Arsenal the victory. After the match, Arsène Wenger praised the striker and said that "Welbeck can still have a dream career".

On 28 January 2017, Welbeck made his first start of the 2016–17 season in a fourth round FA Cup tie against Southampton. He scored Arsenal's first two goals before assisting Theo Walcott's first in an eventual 5–0 win at St Mary's Stadium. He started as Arsenal beat Chelsea 2–1 in the 2017 FA Cup Final at Wembley Stadium on 27 May.

Welbeck started in the 2017 FA Community Shield at Wembley Stadium on 6 August, as Arsenal beat Chelsea 4–1 penalties having drawn 1–1 after extra time. He scored his first goal of the 2017–18 season in Arsenal's 4–3 win over Leicester City in their opening Premier League match. He went on to score twice in the team's second home match of the season, a 3–0 defeat of AFC Bournemouth on 9 September. Welbeck picked up a groin injury during Arsenal's 0–0 draw with Chelsea at Stamford Bridge, which ruled him out for three weeks. Welbeck ended a goalless run of 16 Premier League games to score two and assist the other as the Gunners fought back to beat Southampton 3–2.

Welbeck suffered a broken ankle in a scoreless draw against Sporting CP in the UEFA Europa League group stage. The injury effectively ended his Arsenal tenure. It was reported on 5 May after the match against Brighton, that Welbeck would not be extending his contract with Arsenal. Arsenal confirmed his departure at the end of the season.

=== Watford ===
Welbeck signed for Premier League club Watford on 7 August 2019 on a contract of undisclosed length. Welbeck's debut came in an away match to Everton when he came on in the 67th minute as a substitute, where Watford lost 1–0. He scored his first goal in the EFL Cup game against Swansea City where Watford won 2–1. Welbeck scored his first league goal for Watford in a 2–1 home win over Norwich City. He left the club by mutual consent on 6 October 2020.

=== Brighton & Hove Albion ===
Welbeck signed for Premier League club Brighton & Hove Albion on 18 October 2020 on a free transfer on a one-year contract. He made his debut two weeks later, coming on as a substitute for Leandro Trossard in a 2–1 away defeat against Tottenham Hotspur. He made his first start five days later, playing 86 minutes of a 0–0 home draw against fellow Premier League side Burnley. On 21 November 2020, Welbeck scored his first Brighton goal in a 2–1 away league win over Aston Villa. On his first appearance in front of Albion fans, during the brief period in December when fan attendance was permitted, Welbeck scored his first home goal for the Seagulls on 20 December, an 87th-minute equaliser in a 1–1 draw against Sheffield United. On 4 April 2021, he scored against former and boyhood club Manchester United at Old Trafford putting the Seagulls ahead, however they went on to lose 2–1. Welbeck played in Brighton's 3–2 home victory over champions Manchester City on 18 May, with fans returning to football, in which they came back from 2–0 down to beat City for the first time since 1989. However, Welbeck's appearance was cut short, going off injured in the 29th minute.

On 23 June 2021, Brighton announced Welbeck had signed a new one-year contract with the club. He scored his first goal of the 2021–22 season glancing home a near-post header from a Leandro Trossard cross, scoring Albion's second in a 2–1 home victory over Leicester City on 19 September. In October it was revealed that Welbeck had undergone surgery on a hamstring problem and would miss the rest of 2021. However, he did make a return shortly before the new year, coming on as a substitute on Boxing Day, in the 2–0 home victory over Brentford. Three days later, making another substitute appearance, Welbeck scored a stoppage-time headed equaliser away at European champions Chelsea to earn the Seagulls a second draw at Stamford Bridge two seasons running, and scoring the club's first ever goal at the stadium as the game finished 1–1. He scored against Leicester in the reverse fixture on 23 January 2022, scoring two in two against the Foxes, heading in the equaliser in a 1–1 away draw. In Brighton's last game of the season, he set up Pascal Groß's goal before Groß returned the favour for Albion's third in the 3–1 home victory over West Ham United, helping Brighton to a ninth-place finish, their highest ever in the English top-flight.

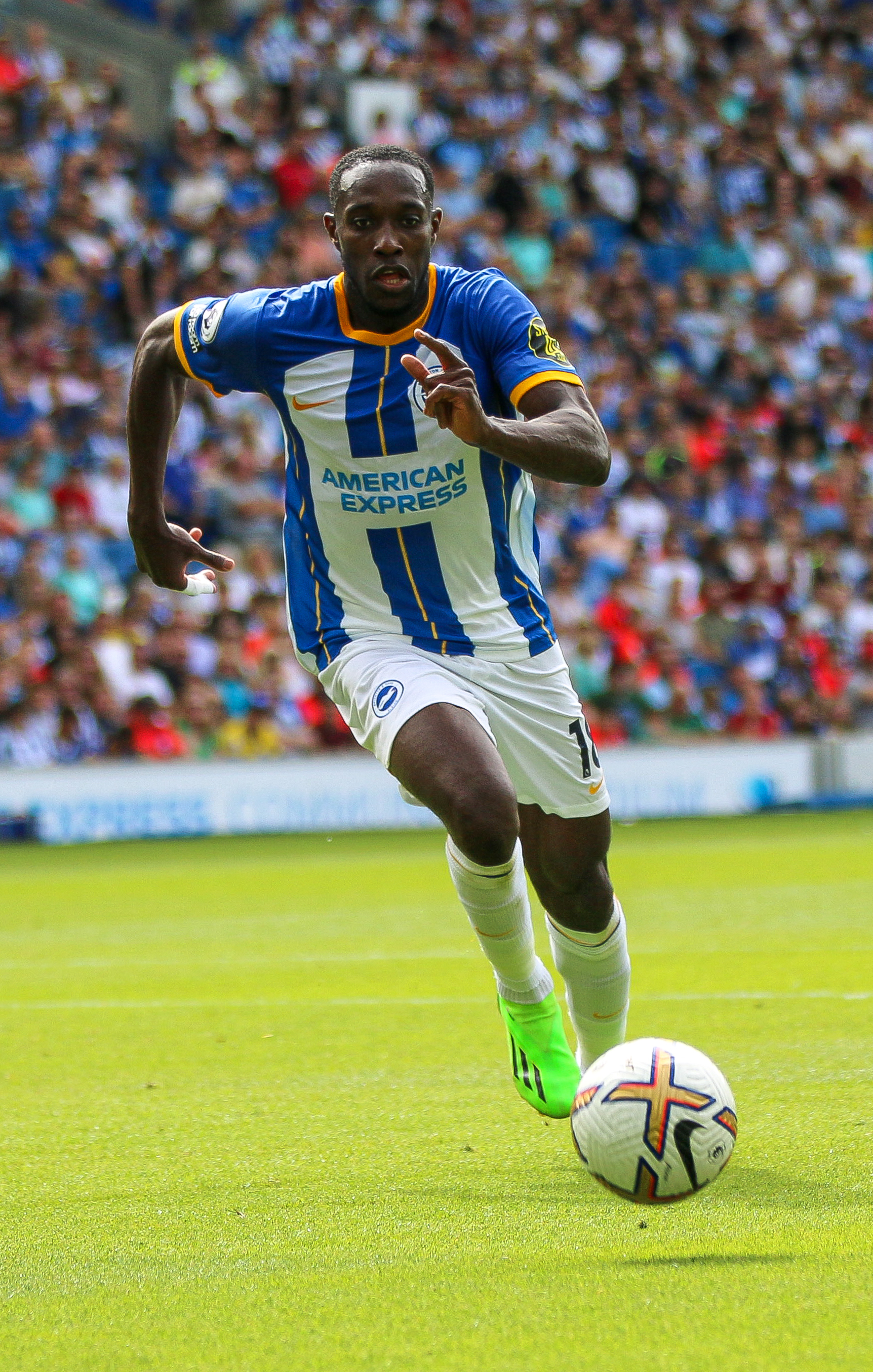
Welbeck playing for Brighton & Hove Albion in 2022

In the opening game of the 2022–23 season, Welbeck helped Brighton to their first ever win at his old ground Old Trafford, assisting Groß's first of two in the 2–1 win over Manchester United. Welbeck subsequently signed a new two-year contract with the club, taking him through to 2024. He scored his first goal of the season on 9 November, scoring a penalty to equalise in an eventual 3–1 EFL Cup third round win away at his former club, Arsenal. After a period out injured, on his return on 14 January 2023, Welbeck scored Brighton's third goal – his first league goal of the season – after coming off the bench in a 3–0 home win over Liverpool. On 29 April, Welbeck scored his first Brighton brace and made an assist, helping Brighton to their biggest Premier League victory, a 6–0 win over Wolverhampton Wanderers.

On 16 September 2023, Welbeck scored his first goal of the 2023–24 season in a 3–1 away win at Old Trafford. He went on to make 29 league appearances, scoring 5 goals.

On 14 March 2024, Welbeck netted the only goal in Brighton's 1–0 home win versus AS Roma in the Last 16 of the UEFA Europa League. This was merely a consolation goal, however, after Roma had run out 4–0 winners in the first leg in Rome as the Seagulls were eliminated in their debut European season.

In May 2024, Welbeck extended his contract with Brighton to June 2026. On 5 April 2025, Welbeck became Brighton's top all-time Premier League scorer, netting his 31st league goal for his club against Crystal Palace.

In March 2026, Welbeck triggered an optional one-year extension to his contract to remain at Brighton.

=== Chelsea ===
On 1 August 2026, Welbeck signed for Chelsea on a two-year contract.

On 27 August 2026, Welbeck scored his first goal for Chelsea on his debut in the EFL Cup Second Round against Luton Town.

== International career ==
=== England youth squads ===
Welbeck made his England under-16s debut as a 14-year-old in October 2005; he replaced Nathan Porritt in the 70th minute of the 4–0 win against Wales in the 2005 Victory Shield. England would go on to share the Shield with Wales after finishing level at the top of the table. He then progressed to the England under-17s team, scoring the decider in a qualifying match against Serbia, to help his team progress to the 2007 UEFA European Under-17 Championship. The tournament saw England finish as runners-up to Spain, which secured the team a place in the 2007 FIFA U-17 World Cup in South Korea. There, Welbeck scored two goals against New Zealand, helping England to reach the quarter-finals in their first involvement in the tournament. Welbeck was originally intended to be a squad member for England's European Under-19 Championship campaign in July 2008, but was forced to withdraw. He eventually made his debut for the under-19s on 9 September 2008, playing the full 90 minutes in a 2–1 win over the Netherlands.

Welbeck made his England under-21 debut on 10 February 2009, in the 3–2 loss to Ecuador, coming on for Adam Johnson. He followed this up with another substitute appearance in a 2–0 home defeat to France on 31 March. He was then named in Stuart Pearce's original 23-man squad for the 2009 UEFA European Under-21 Championship in Sweden on 27 May, but he had to pull out of the squad on 31 May, due to an injury. On 7 September 2010, Welbeck scored his first two goals for the England under-21 team in a 3–0 win over Lithuania. He scored his third under-21 goal in a 4–0 away victory over Denmark on 24 March 2011. Welbeck then started the first match of England's campaign at the 2011 UEFA European Under-21 Championship against Spain. Welbeck scored an 88th-minute equaliser as England began the tournament with a 1–1 draw.

=== England senior team ===
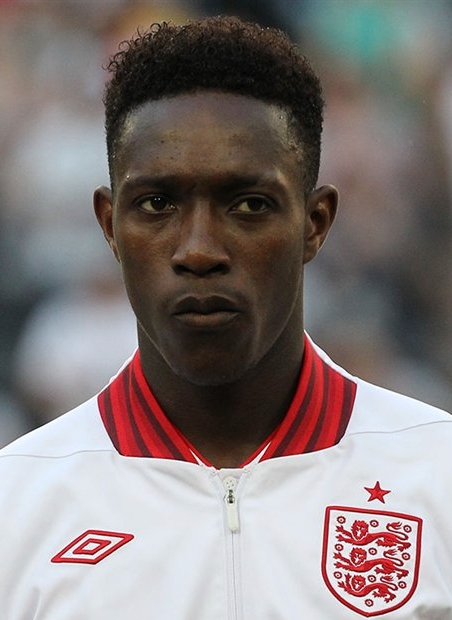
Welbeck with England at UEFA Euro 2012

On 18 November 2008, it was reported that the Ghana Football Association was keeping tabs on Welbeck, with a view to him representing the Ghana national team in the future. On 29 March 2011, Welbeck was called up to the England squad, for their friendly fixture against Ghana. Welbeck replaced Ashley Young in the 81st minute of a 1–1 draw with Ghana at Wembley Stadium.

He played in England's deciding UEFA Euro 2012 qualifier against Montenegro on 7 October 2011, coming on as a substitute for Theo Walcott in the second half. On 29 May 2012, Welbeck was listed as a part of the confirmed 23-man squad for Roy Hodgson's England squad for UEFA Euro 2012. On 2 June 2012, he scored his first goal for England in a 1–0 win against Belgium, with a chip over goalkeeper Simon Mignolet after collecting a through ball from his Manchester United teammate Ashley Young. On 15 June 2012, Welbeck scored a backheeled winning goal in the 79th minute as England beat Sweden 3–2 in UEFA Euro 2012 in Kyiv.

Welbeck scored four goals in England's qualification for the 2014 FIFA World Cup, braces in two home matches: a 5–0 win over San Marino on 12 October 2012 and a 4–0 victory against Moldova on 6 September 2013, He was called up for the final squad for the tournament. and started in England's opening 2–1 defeat to Italy before being substituted for Ross Barkley after 61 minutes. Welbeck also played England's second group match, a loss by the same score to Uruguay in which he was substituted for Adam Lallana for the last 19 minutes.

On 8 September 2014, in England's first match of UEFA Euro 2016 qualifying, Welbeck scored both goals in a 2–0 victory away to Switzerland at St. Jakob-Park, Basel. He then scored in matches against San Marino, Slovenia and Lithuania to make him the top goalscorer in the qualifying phase with six goals from five matches.

During March 2018, Welbeck was selected for the national team for friendlies in preparation for the 2018 FIFA World Cup alongside Arsenal teammate Jack Wilshere. He was named in the 23-man England squad for the 2018 FIFA World Cup. His only match of the tournament came in England's final group game which was against Belgium at the Kaliningrad Stadium on 28 June, with both teams already through to the knockouts. He replaced Liverpool's teenage full back Trent Alexander-Arnold in the 79th minute where Belgium won the match 1–0 with a 59th minute Adnan Januzaj goal to win Group G.

== Style of play ==
Due to his height and running style, Welbeck has been compared to former Arsenal striker Emmanuel Adebayor, but styled his game on another former Arsenal forward, his boyhood hero Thierry Henry.

He has also been known for his work-rate and has been described as strong, quick, and very good in the air.

Critics have acknowledged the strength in Welbeck's style of play such as his work-rate, pace and intelligence in following tactical command, especially after his performance in both of Manchester United's Champions League knock-out stage matches against Real Madrid in 2013. Welbeck has been praised as a big game player.

Under former England manager Roy Hodgson, who favoured the 4–3–3 formation, Welbeck's ability in supporting the attack, pressing the midfield, and hold up play fit well into the system.

== Career statistics ==
=== Club ===
As of match played 21 November 2026

Appearances and goals by club, season and competition
Club	Season	League			FA Cup		League Cup		Europe		Other		Total	
Club	Season	Division	Apps	Goals	Apps	Goals	Apps	Goals	Apps	Goals	Apps	Goals	Apps	Goals
Manchester United	2007–08	Premier League	0	0	0	0	0	0	0	0	0	0	0	0
Manchester United	2008–09	Premier League	3	1	5	2	5	0	0	0	0	0	13	3
Manchester United	2009–10	Premier League	5	0	1	0	3	2	2 (Note: Appearances in UEFA Champions League)	0	0	0	11	2
Manchester United	2011–12	Premier League	30	9	2	1	1	0	5 (Note: Two appearances and two goals in UEFA Champions League, three appearances in UEFA Europa League)	2	1 (Note: Appearance in FA Community Shield)	0	39	12
Manchester United	2012–13	Premier League	27	1	4	0	2	0	7	1	—		40	2
Manchester United	2013–14	Premier League	25	9	1	0	4	0	5	1	1	0	36	10
Manchester United	2014–15	Premier League	2	0	—		1	0	—		—		3	0
Manchester United	Total		92	20	13	3	16	2	19	4	2	0	142	29
Preston North End (loan)	2009–10	Championship	8	2	—		—		—		—		8	2
Sunderland (loan)	2010–11	Premier League	26	6	0	0	2	0	—		—		28	6
Arsenal	2014–15	Premier League	25	4	3	1	—		6	3	—		34	8
Arsenal	2015–16	Premier League	11	4	2	1	0	0	2	0	0	0	15	5
Arsenal	2016–17	Premier League	16	2	4	2	0	0	0	0	—		20	4
Arsenal	2017–18	Premier League	28	5	1	1	3	1	10 (Note: Appearances in UEFA Europa League)	3	1	0	43	10
Arsenal	2018–19	Premier League	8	1	0	0	2	2	4	2	—		14	5
Arsenal	Total		88	16	10	5	5	3	22	8	1	0	126	32
Watford	2019–20	Premier League	18	2	0	0	2	1	—		—		20	3
Brighton & Hove Albion	2020–21	Premier League	24	6	0	0	—		—		—		24	6
Brighton & Hove Albion	2021–22	Premier League	25	6	2	0	0	0	—		—		27	6
Brighton & Hove Albion	2022–23	Premier League	31	6	5	0	1	1	—		—		37	7
Brighton & Hove Albion	2023–24	Premier League	29	5	3	1	1	0	4	1	—		37	7
Brighton & Hove Albion	2024–25	Premier League	30	10	4	1	2	0	—		—		36	11
Brighton & Hove Albion	2025–26	Premier League	37	13	1	1	2	0	—		—		40	14
Brighton & Hove Albion	Total		176	46	15	3	6	1	4	1	—		201	51
Chelsea	2026–27	Premier League	9	0	0	0	3	3	—		—		12	3
Career total			415	92	38	11	34	10	45	13	3	0	537	126

=== International ===
Appearances and goals by national team and year
National team	Year	Apps	Goals
England	2011	3	0
England	2012	11	5
England	2013	6	3
England	2014	12	5
England	2015	1	1
England	2016	1	0
England	2017	2	1
England	2018	6	1
Total		42	16

England score listed first, score column indicates score after each Welbeck goal

List of international goals scored by Danny Welbeck
No.	Date	Venue	Cap	Opponent	Score	Result	Competition	Ref.
1	2 June 2012	Wembley Stadium, London, England	5	Belgium	1–0	1–0	Friendly	
2	15 June 2012	Olimpiyskiy National Sports Complex, Kyiv, Ukraine	7	Sweden	3–2	3–2	UEFA Euro 2012	
3	12 October 2012	Wembley Stadium, London, England	12	San Marino	2–0	5–0	2014 FIFA World Cup qualification	
4	12 October 2012	Wembley Stadium, London, England	12	San Marino	4–0	5–0	2014 FIFA World Cup qualification	
5	14 November 2012	Friends Arena, Solna, Sweden	14	Sweden	1–1	2–4	Friendly	
6	14 August 2013	Wembley Stadium, London, England	17	Scotland	2–2	3–2	Friendly	
7	6 September 2013	Wembley Stadium, London, England	18	Moldova	3–0	4–0	2014 FIFA World Cup qualification	
8	6 September 2013	Wembley Stadium, London, England	18	Moldova	4–0	4–0	2014 FIFA World Cup qualification	
9	8 September 2014	St. Jakob-Park, Basel, Switzerland	28	Switzerland	1–0	2–0	UEFA Euro 2016 qualifying	
10	8 September 2014	St. Jakob-Park, Basel, Switzerland	28	Switzerland	2–0	2–0	UEFA Euro 2016 qualifying	
11	9 October 2014	Wembley Stadium, London, England	29	San Marino	3–0	5–0	UEFA Euro 2016 qualifying	
12	15 November 2014	Wembley Stadium, London, England	31	Slovenia	2–1	3–1	UEFA Euro 2016 qualifying	
13	15 November 2014	Wembley Stadium, London, England	31	Slovenia	3–1	3–1	UEFA Euro 2016 qualifying	
14	27 March 2015	Wembley Stadium, London, England	33	Lithuania	2–0	4–0	UEFA Euro 2016 qualifying	
15	1 September 2017	National Stadium, Ta' Qali, Malta	35	Malta	3–0	4–0	2018 FIFA World Cup qualification	
16	7 June 2018	Elland Road, Leeds, England	39	Costa Rica	2–0	2–0	Friendly	

== Honours ==
Manchester United

- Premier League: 2012–13
- Football League Cup: 2008–09, 2009–10
- FA Community Shield: 2011, 2013
- FIFA Club World Cup: 2008

Arsenal

- FA Cup: 2014–15, 2016–17
- FA Community Shield: 2017
- EFL Cup runner-up: 2017–18
- UEFA Europa League runner-up: 2018–19

England U19

- UEFA European Under-19 Championship runner-up: 2009

Individual

- Jimmy Murphy Young Player of the Year: 2007–08
