= Neil Mellor =

English footballer (born 1982)

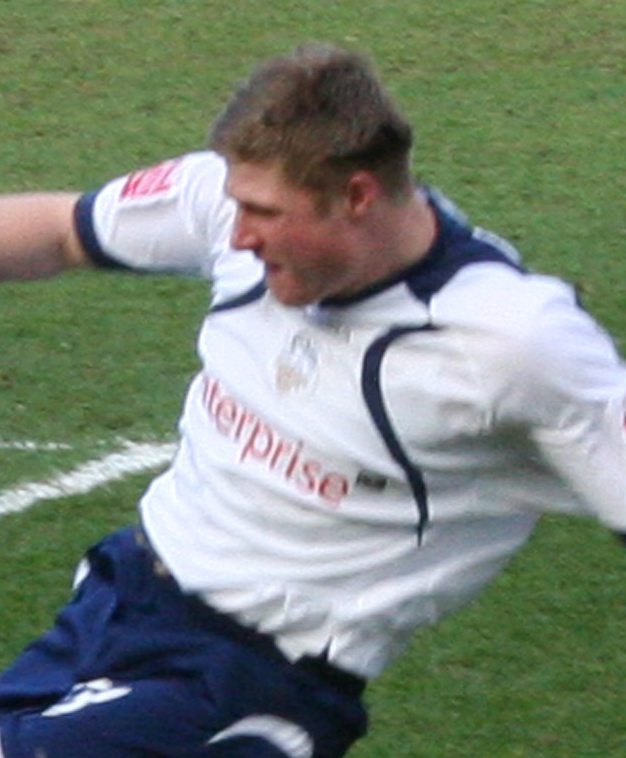
- Mellor playing for Preston North End in 2008

Personal information
- Full name: Neil Andrew Mellor
- Date of birth: 4 November 1982 (age 43)
- Place of birth: Sheffield, England
- Height: 1.84 m (6 ft 0 in)
- Position: Striker

Youth career
- 1999–2002: Liverpool

Senior career*
Years	Team	Apps	(Gls)
2002–2006	Liverpool	12	(2)
2003–2004	→ West Ham United (loan)	16	(2)
2006	→ Wigan Athletic (loan)	3	(1)
2006–2012	Preston North End	130	(38)
2010–2011	→ Sheffield Wednesday (loan)	33	(13)
Total		194	(56)
- * Club domestic league appearances and goals

Neil Andrew Mellor (born 4 November 1982) is an English retired professional footballer who played as a striker. He began his career at Liverpool in the Premier League. He made his name in 2004 by scoring a stunning last-minute goal from long range to give Liverpool a 2–1 victory over Arsenal at Anfield. Mellor also scored a vital goal and set up another during Liverpool's match with Olympiacos at Anfield during the group stage of the 2004–05 UEFA Champions League, which Liverpool went on to win. He later played for Preston North End. In December 2011, a knee injury sustained following a tackle by Milton Keynes striker Jabo Ibehre resulted in Mellor being forced into announcing his retirement on 9 May 2012. Since his retirement, Mellor has been doing media work, including match updates for Sky Sports News and work for LFC TV.

== Career ==
=== Liverpool ===
The son of former Manchester City, Norwich City, Sheffield Wednesday and Brighton and Hove Albion player Ian Mellor, Mellor was born in Sheffield, South Yorkshire. A strong, physical, centre forward, Mellor was top scorer in Liverpool's run to the FA Youth Cup semi-final during the 2000–01 season scoring eight goals in four games. He was also the top scorer for the under-19 team and Joe Corrigan's reserves during the 2001–02 season and in total scored 46 goals (56 including friendlies). Mellor progressed through the ranks at Liverpool and in the 2002–03 season he scored 20 goals for the reserve team. He made his first team debut in the same season and played a total of six games and scored in a League Cup semi-final match against Sheffield United. Although the Reds lost the match 2–1, Mellor showed promise and was rewarded in March 2003 with a new three-year contract running to 2006. Despite his goal he was left out of the squad for the victorious 2003 Football League Cup Final.

Manager Gérard Houllier sent Mellor on a year-long loan to West Ham United in August 2003. He scored two goals in the 3–0 win over Crystal Palace at the end of September, but an injury hit spell at Upton Park, in addition to playing under three different managers and being forced to play out of position, proved unsettling. Mellor was soon back at Anfield and hit 10 goals in just four games for the reserves. Before the start of the 2004–05 season, Mellor suffered a knee injury but regained fitness and a return to the first team in the 3–0 League Cup victory at Millwall. In the next round he scored two goals to knock out holders Middlesbrough, and in late November he started a UEFA Champions League game at Monaco.

After becoming a fixture in first team squad, Mellor burst into the starting team with some style. With Liverpool and Arsenal level at 1–1 with 90 minutes gone at Anfield in November 2004, he cracked in a sensational 30-yard volley to win the game for Liverpool. Things got better still for Mellor ten days later when Liverpool were being held 1–1 by Olympiacos in a game they had to win by two clear goals to progress to the Champions League knock out stages. He was brought into the game to replace Milan Baroš and within two minutes, he scored with a typical goal poacher's finish. Then, a cushioned header from Mellor set up Steven Gerrard to rifle in the third Liverpool goal and seal Liverpool's place in the last 16. He scored his second and what proved to be his final league goal for Liverpool in December 2004 in the 3–1 win over Newcastle at Anfield.

In March 2005, Mellor was ruled out for the remainder of the 2004–05 season after undergoing surgery on both knees. This robbed the young striker of his chance of European glory as his teammates succeeded in bringing a fifth European cup back to Anfield. Although Mellor played no part in the knock out stages, his contribution to that year's success was massive. Mellor returned to action for the Liverpool reserve side in the 2005–06 season coming on as a substitute in their 2–0 victory at Manchester United in December 2005. He was back on the scoresheet in his first start in a year as Liverpool cruised into the quarter-finals of the Liverpool Senior Cup after a 3–0 win over Runcorn.

In January 2006, Mellor joined Wigan Athletic on loan for the remainder of the season. In his first match against Middlesbrough, he scored the winner during injury time in a 3–2 victory. However, further knee injuries that required more surgery ended his spell at Wigan after three games.

In 2006, despite a relative lack of first-team football at Liverpool, Mellor was voted into 90th position in a poll to find 100 Players Who Shook the Kop, ahead of such players as Mohamed Sissoko and Nigel Clough.

=== Preston North End ===
In August 2006, Mellor signed a three-year contract with Football League Championship club Preston North End for an undisclosed fee, thought to be in the region of £1.5m. Manager Paul Simpson said, "Neil is a goalscorer and hopefully that will continue to be the case. He is a tremendous signing. He has had his injury problems but we are happy he is over those and it's just a case now of building up his fitness levels." Another knee injury suffered in a pre-season friendly against Bolton Wanderers required more surgery and delayed Mellor's debut for Preston. Mellor finally got his first goal for Preston in the 3–1 victory over Southampton in March 2007. Out of favour under the Paul Simpson managerial era, Mellor had to prove himself over again to new P.N.E boss Alan Irvine. Under Irvine, Mellor finally got going and scored nine goals under him after Christmas 2007. Mellor again showed his panache for the 30-yard volley on 30 July 2008 by scoring in similar fashion for Preston North End in their friendly against Motherwell at Fir Park, which earned a 1–1 draw for Preston. During pre-season 2008–09 Mellor scored eight goals. He signed a new four-year contract in October 2008.

Despite the promising pre-season and Mellor being a favourite amongst sections of the Deepdale crowd, indifferent form led to him losing his place to new signing Jon Parkin. Mellor regained his place in the team in time to score in Preston's 3–1 victory away at local rivals Blackpool, but another injury saw him miss a number of games. He regained fitness for a match against former club Liverpool in the FA Cup 3rd round, which Preston lost 2–0.

On 2 July 2010, Mellor rejoined former manager Alan Irvine at Football League One side Sheffield Wednesday on a season long loan. Mellor played his first league game for The Owls on 7 August 2010 against Dagenham & Redbridge, coming on as a substitute in place of Clinton Morrison. He scored his first professional career hat-trick for Sheffield Wednesday on 10 November 2010 in a 4–1 win at Hillsborough over Hartlepool United in the Football League Trophy. He then repeated this feat just 10 days later in another 4–1 win, this time away against MK Dons in the league. After he sustained a minor injury against Carlisle United, Mellor struggled to regain form, and rarely started games. Mellor was eventually recalled to first team action against Colchester United in a game where he scored two goals in a 2–1 victory for the Owls. A few days later, he started another home match, this time against Tranmere Rovers setting up two first half goals, before winning a penalty, of which Owls captain Tommy Miller duly converted. Mellor scored the final goal of the match from a tight angle at the 90-minute mark.

Mellor scored his first goal for Preston North End since March 2010 on the opening day of the 2011–12 season, scoring their first goal in a 4–2 defeat to Colchester United at Deepdale. In the December of that season, Mellor picked up a knee injury in the 1–0 win over Milton Keynes and was ruled out for three months. After an injury-plagued season at Preston, Mellor announced his retirement on 9 May 2012.

== After football ==
After his retirement from professional football, Mellor returned to Liverpool to do media and commentary work with their in-house television company LFC TV.

== Career statistics ==
Appearances and goals by club, season and competition
Club	Season	League			FA Cup		League Cup		Other		Total	
Club	Season	Division	Apps	Goals	Apps	Goals	Apps	Goals	Apps	Goals	Apps	Goals
Liverpool	2002–03	Premier League	3	0	1	0	2	1	0	0	6	1
Liverpool	2003–04	Premier League	0	0	0	0	0	0	0	0	0	0
Liverpool	2004–05	Premier League	9	2	1	0	4	2	2 (Note: Appearance(s) in UEFA Champions League)	1	16	5
Liverpool	2005–06	Premier League	0	0	0	0	0	0	0	0	0	0
Liverpool	Total		12	2	2	0	6	3	2	1	22	6
West Ham United (loan)	2003–04	First Division	16	2	3	0	2	0	0	0	21	2
Wigan Athletic (loan)	2005–06	Premier League	3	1	1	0	1	0	—		5	1
Preston North End	2006–07	Championship	5	1	2	0	0	0	—		7	1
Preston North End	2007–08	Championship	36	9	3	1	1	0	—		40	10
Preston North End	2008–09	Championship	33	10	1	0	2	2	2 (Note: Appearance(s) in Football League Championship play-offs)	0	38	12
Preston North End	2009–10	Championship	39	10	2	0	3	1	—		44	11
Preston North End	2010–11	Championship	0	0	0	0	0	0	—		0	0
Preston North End	2011–12	League One	17	8	1	0	2	1	1 (Note: Appearance(s) in Football League Trophy)	0	21	9
Preston North End	Total		130	38	9	1	8	4	3	0	150	43
Sheffield Wednesday (loan)	2010–11	League One	33	13	4	2	2	1	4	4	43	20
Career total			194	56	19	3	19	8	9	5	241	72
