= Andy Owens =

English footballer (born 1989)

Personal information
- Full name: Andrew James Owens
- Date of birth: 15 October 1989 (age 37)
- Place of birth: Liverpool, England
- Position: Forward

Youth career
- 2005–2006: Liverpool

Senior career*
Years	Team	Apps	(Gls)
2007–2008	Stoke City	0	(0)
2009–2010	Stafford Rangers	7	(3)
2009–2010	Altrincham	2	(0)
2010–2011	Rhyl	7	(0)
2011–2012	Accrington Stanley	3	(0)
2012–2012	Southport	39	(4)
2012–2013	Mansfield Town	2	(0)
2012–2013	→ Southport (loan)	22	(5)
2013–2015	AFC Telford United	54	(7)
2013–2014	→ Barrow (loan)	3	(1)
2014–2015	→ Stockport County (loan)	6	(0)
2015–2016	Marine	27	(5)
2016–2017	Stalybridge Celtic		
2017	Altrincham	14	(2)
2017–2018	Skelmersdale United	20	(11)
2018–2019	Connah's Quay Nomads	38	(12)
2019–2020	Airbus UK Broughton	23	(8)
2020–2021	Radcliffe	8	(2)
2020–2021	→ Chorley (dual registration)	6	(2)
2021–2022	Chorley	18	(2)
2022–2023	Macclesfield	12	(1)
2022–2023	→ Chorley (dual registration)	0	(0)
2024–2025	City of Liverpool	8	(2)

International career
2012	England C	2	(0)

Managerial career
- 2024–2025: City of Liverpool (caretaker)
- 2025: City of Liverpool
- * Club domestic league appearances and goals as of 10:41, 7 September 2022 (UTC)

Andrew James Owens (born 15 October 1989) is an English manager and former professional footballer who plays as a forward.

== Career ==
Born in Liverpool, Owens began his career with his home town club Liverpool but later moved to Stoke City. After being released by Stoke he spent time with Stafford Rangers and Altrincham, before joining Welsh Premier League side Rhyl. He made his debut in a 3–1 defeat to Bangor City.

A former member of the Glenn Hoddle Academy, Owens spent time on trial with Morecambe before joining Accrington Stanley in August 2010. He made his debut for the club on 21 August 2010 in a Football League Two clash with Macclesfield Town which ended in a 3–0 home win at the Crown Ground, coming on as a second-half substitute for Sean Hessey.

It was announced by Accrington on 23 May that he would be released at the end of June 2011 when his current contract expired. He went on to join Southport on 13 July 2011 and made his competitive club debut on 13 August 2011 on the first day of the 2011–12 season. During his time at Southport, Owens began to play as a forward, having previously played as a defender.

In June 2012 he signed for Mansfield Town.

In November 2012 Owens re-joined Southport on loan from Mansfield Town until January.

In June 2013 he joined AFC Telford United, linking up with Liam Watson, who had previously managed Owens at Southport. He scored his first goal for Telford away to Brackley in a 1–1 draw. On 26 April 2014 he won promotion to the Conference Premier with Telford after they clinched the Conference North title on the final game of the season. He spent periods out on loan at Barrow, Stockport County and Marine, and later joined Marine on a permanent basis.

In June 2016, he signed for Stalybridge Celtic and scored on his debut against Boston United. He left the club in December 2016, having scored 7 goals in 22 appearances in all competitions.

Following his departure from Stalybridge. he signed forms with Buxton, but left for Altrincham days later. He made his debut for the Robins on New Years Day 2017, scoring in a 1–1 draw against FC United.

In January 2018, Owens returned to the Welsh Premier League with Connah's Quay Nomads. Owens played a key role in Connah's Quays successful 2017-18 Welsh Cup campaign, scoring a hat trick against Bangor City in the semi-finals, and scoring against Aberystwyth Town in the final.

In 2019, Owens joined Airbus UK Broughton. On 11 June 2020, he signed for Radcliffe F.C. and on 24 December he joined Chorley through dual registration, allowing him to play for both teams. He scored in his debut, with his first touch, two days later in a 3–1 win against A.F.C. Fylde. He signed permanently for Chorley in April 2021. In January 2022, he dropped down three divisions to sign for North West Counties Football League Premier Division side Macclesfield.

== Managerial career ==
In January 2025, Owens was appointed manager of City of Liverpool having taken caretaker charge the previous month.
