= Tom Smyth =

English footballer

Personal information
- Full name: Thomas Joseph Smyth
- Date of birth: 18 March 1991 (age 35)
- Place of birth: Southport, England
- Position: Defender

Youth career
- ?–2009: Preston North End

Senior career*
Years	Team	Apps	(Gls)
2009–2010	Preston North End	0	(0)
2010	Northwich Victoria		
2010–2011	Accrington Stanley	4	(0)
2010–2011	→ Workington (loan)	11	(0)
2011	Workington		
2011–2012	Northwich Victoria		
2012–2014	Colwyn Bay		
2014–????	Chorley		
- * Club domestic league appearances and goals

Thomas Joseph Smyth (born 18 March 1991) is an English former footballer.

== Club career ==
Smyth started his career with Preston North End where he was a former captain of Preston's youth side and was a regular at reserve team level in 2009, the same year as he was handed his first professional contract. He was formerly a striker at Preston but converted to a defender whilst at the club.

In June 2010 he signed for League two club Accrington Stanley on a 1-year contract. He made his debut on 31 August 2010 in a Football League Trophy match against Tranmere Rovers coming on as a 13th-minute substitute.

In December 2010 he joined Conference North side Workington A.F.C. on loan. He made his debut for Workington on 11 December in a league match against Stafford Rangers but bad weather saw further games postponed. It was reported that he had returned to Accrington on 24 December but his loan was later extended.

It was announced by Accrington on 23 May that he would be released at the end of June 2011 when his current contract expired.

In October 2011 he re-joined Northwich Victoria for his second spell at the club. In May 2012 he moved to Colwyn Bay.

In summer 2014 he joined Chorley.
