= Fabian Delph =

English footballer (born 1989)

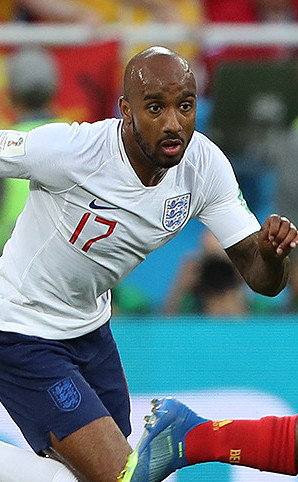
- Delph playing for England at the 2018 FIFA World Cup

Personal information
- Full name: Fabian Delph
- Date of birth: 21 November 1989 (age 37)
- Place of birth: Bradford, England
- Height: 5 ft 9 in (1.74 m)
- Positions: Midfielder; left-back

Youth career
- 2000–2001: Bradford City
- 2001–2006: Leeds United

Senior career*
Years	Team	Apps	(Gls)
2006–2009	Leeds United	44	(6)
2009–2015	Aston Villa	112	(3)
2012	→ Leeds United (loan)	5	(0)
2015–2019	Manchester City	57	(4)
2019–2022	Everton	35	(0)
Total		253	(13)

International career
2008	England U19	2	(0)
2008–2009	England U21	4	(0)
2014–2019	England	20	(0)
Medal record
Men's football
Representing England
UEFA Nations League
Third place	2019 Portugal
- * Club domestic league appearances and goals

Fabian Delph (born 21 November 1989) is an English former professional footballer who primarily played as a midfielder.

He was on the books of Bradford City as a youngster, joining their youth academy in 2000, until he moved to Leeds United aged 11. Having played 45 matches for Leeds at League One level and once in the Championship, he transferred to Premier League club Aston Villa in August 2009 for £6 million. In 2012, he returned to Leeds for a short loan spell. Delph had a successful start to the 2012–13 Premier League season, leading Villa manager Paul Lambert to call for his inclusion in the England squad. In July 2015, Delph joined Manchester City for £8 million. In 2019, he moved to fellow Premier League side Everton, where he went on to spend three seasons until his departure in June 2022, before announcing his retirement from football in September that year.

A full international from 2014 to 2019, Delph represented England at under-19 and under-21 level and made his senior debut at the age of 24, and would later go on to make 20 appearances for the national team. He also represented his country at the 2018 FIFA World Cup in Russia.

== Club career ==
=== Leeds United ===
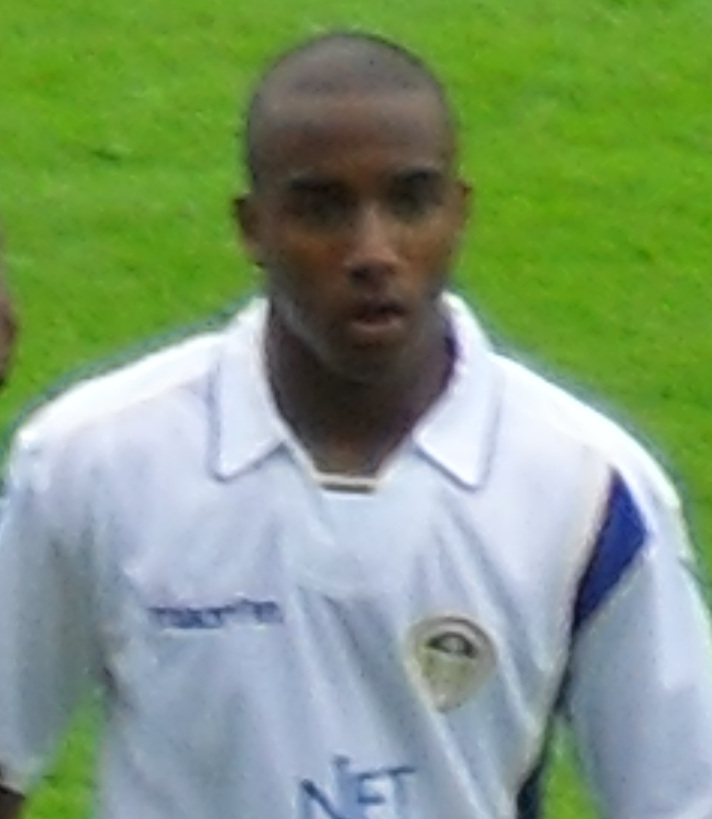
Delph playing for Leeds United in 2009

Born in Bradford, West Yorkshire, Delph started his career in football as a youngster at Bradford City. Delph left City in September 2001 to join Leeds United after he was recommended to their academy coach Greg Abbott by former Bradford manager Paul Jewell, whose son played with Delph. He went to Tong Secondary School, which he left in 2006 to sign a two-year scholarship with Leeds United, at the age of 16. He completed his studies at the partner school to Leeds, Boston Spa School.

After a string of impressive performances in spring 2007, Delph was made captain of the Leeds Reserves. He, along with Robert Bayly, was given his debut at Leeds as a substitute in the final match of the 2006–07 season against Derby County on 6 May 2007. He was awarded his first professional contract on 11 January 2008, and made two substitute appearances for Leeds in the 2007–08 season.

Delph impressed in the 2008–09 pre-season friendly against Barnet, earning praise from manager Gary McAllister and former Leeds player Eddie Gray. He made his first League Cup start in Leeds' 5–2 win away at Chester City in the first round on 13 August 2008. Having gained more first-team experience, on 5 September 2008, Delph signed a new four-year contract at Leeds. He celebrated his new contract by scoring his first senior goal the following day as Leeds defeated Crewe Alexandra 5–2. He soon after scored two long range shots against Walsall during a 3–0 win.

Delph's form attracted the attention of Premier League managers, with Arsenal's Arsène Wenger reported to be lining up a £6 million bid for the midfielder, and Newcastle United having a bid rejected by Leeds chairman Ken Bates. His performances also prompted Stuart Pearce to give Delph his first call-up to the England under-21 squad in November 2008. He was a late substitute for Craig Gardner as England defeated Czech Republic to win his first under-21 cap on 18 November. During the January 2009 transfer window, Leeds rejected another two bids from Premier League for Delph, with Bates saying: "We explained to both clubs that we don't deal in petty cash." The following day he scored a "goal of genuine quality" against Brighton & Hove Albion by finding the top corner of the goal with a curling shot following a long run. Manager Simon Grayson said: "If he scores goals like that, his value is going to go up. It certainly won't go down." Despite the attention of Premier League managers, Delph remained with Leeds as the January transfer window closed.

By March 2009, his performances during the 2008–09 season earned Delph a nomination for the League One player of the year, which was won by Leicester City's Matty Fryatt, and helped him to win the young player of the year in the end of season Football League Awards. The awards for the 2008–09 season did not end there, with Delph winning young player of the season, goal of the season, for his strike against Brighton, and player's player of the season at the club awards. After Leeds lost out in the playoff semi-finals against Millwall, there was much speculation about Delph's future at Leeds, however he did manage to play in Leeds' early pre-season matches, before ultimately Leeds turned down offers from other clubs and Delph completed his move to Aston Villa.

=== Aston Villa ===
After Leeds failed to gain promotion from League One, several Premier League clubs including Everton, Manchester City, Fulham, Sunderland, Tottenham Hotspur and Aston Villa were linked with Delph. On 3 August 2009, Villa agreed an undisclosed fee with Leeds for the transfer of Delph to Villa Park. The transfer was concluded the following day after Delph completed a medical and agreed personal terms.

==== Early career ====
Delph's full Premier League debut came at home against Wigan Athletic on 15 August 2009, the first day of the 2009–10 Premier League season. In a match that Villa lost 2–0, Delph received a yellow card and was replaced in the 61st minute by Steve Sidwell. On 23 January 2010 Delph scored his first goal for Aston Villa in the FA Cup win at home against Brighton & Hove Albion.

On 17 April 2010, Delph had to be carried away from training on a stretcher after picking up a "serious" knee injury. He was immediately taken for tests on the injury. It was later revealed on 19 April 2010 that Delph had suffered a cruciate ligament injury, set to keep him out of action for up to eight months.

Delph returned to action on 26 February 2011, in a Premier League victory over Blackburn Rovers, when he came on as an impromptu left-back after Nathan Baker was injured in the first half.

On 3 March 2011, Delph signed a new deal with Aston Villa keeping him at the club until 2015. He scored his second goal for Villa against Tranmere Rovers in the League Cup on 28 August 2012.

On 20 January 2012, Delph re-signed for Leeds United on loan, initially until 25 February 2012. He made his second Leeds United debut against Ipswich Town on 21 January. Delph picked up an ankle injury in Leeds' defeat to Coventry City and returned to Aston Villa for treatment on the injury. It was revealed that Delph would miss the end of the season, so his loan at Leeds was not renewed and he returned to his parent club.

During the 2012–13 Premier League season, Delph established himself as a regular in Paul Lambert's team, finishing the season with 24 appearances. In the later half of the season, Fabian put in some good performances and began to show a good partnership with Ashley Westwood and Yacouba Sylla in the centre of midfield.

==== 2013–14 season ====
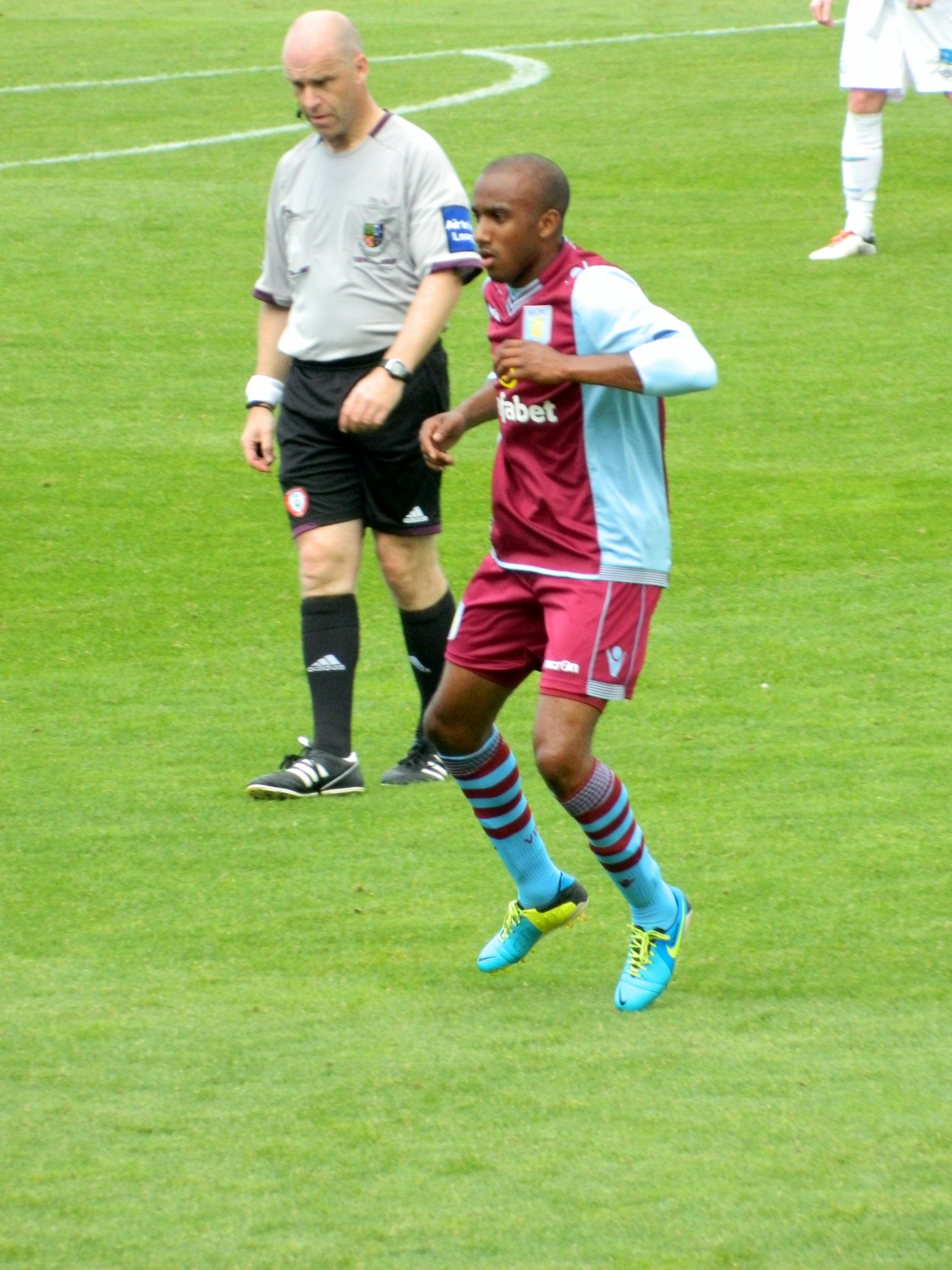
Delph playing for Aston Villa in 2013

Delph started the 2013–14 season very brightly, and put in some of his best performances in a Villa shirt. In the 3–1 away win against Arsenal on the opening day of the season, Delph made a number of successful tackles and dribbles, as well as completing a large number of passes with a high accuracy percentage. He saw a long range, low driven shot from his favoured left foot hit the inside of Arsenal goalkeeper Wojciech Szczęsny's left post, coming very close to his first Premier League goal. His good form continued four days later in a controversial 2–1 loss against Chelsea, and again the following weekend in a 1–0 loss against Liverpool. His first goal of the season came in a 3–0 win over Rotherham United in the League Cup third round. He played a neat one-two with Benteke, took the first touch to control with his favoured left foot and finished with his right within the box. His performances in the opening months of the season earned him the Aston Villa Player of the Month award for August, September and October 2013.

Delph scored for the first time in Premier League with "a goal of brutal brilliance" to complete a 3–2 win away at Southampton on 4 December. His performances over the season including stand out performances against Everton, Liverpool and Chelsea, resulted in him being voted Player of the Year by Aston Villa supporters.

==== 2014–15 season ====
After reports that he could leave the club at the end of the season due to his contract expiring, Delph signed a four-and-a-half-year contract on 25 January 2015, keeping him at Villa until 2019.

On 7 March, Delph scored the first goal as Villa defeated local rivals West Bromwich Albion 2–0 to reach their first FA Cup semi-final since 2010. The victory prompted a pitch invasion by fans, who Delph claimed stole his captain's armband while kissing and biting him. He scored the winning goal in the semi-final on 19 April, as Villa came from behind to defeat Liverpool 2–1 and reach their first FA Cup final since 2000. On 30 May, Delph captained Aston Villa in the 2015 FA Cup Final at Wembley Stadium, where the team were defeated 4–0 by Arsenal.

On 10 July, Delph was reported to be having a medical ahead of an £8 million transfer to Manchester City. Delph never showed up for his scheduled medical, and subsequently released a statement on the Aston Villa website confirming he would be staying at the club and would not be moving to Manchester City. However, reports a week later emerged that Delph had again changed his mind and was having a medical at Manchester City ahead of a prospective move.

=== Manchester City ===
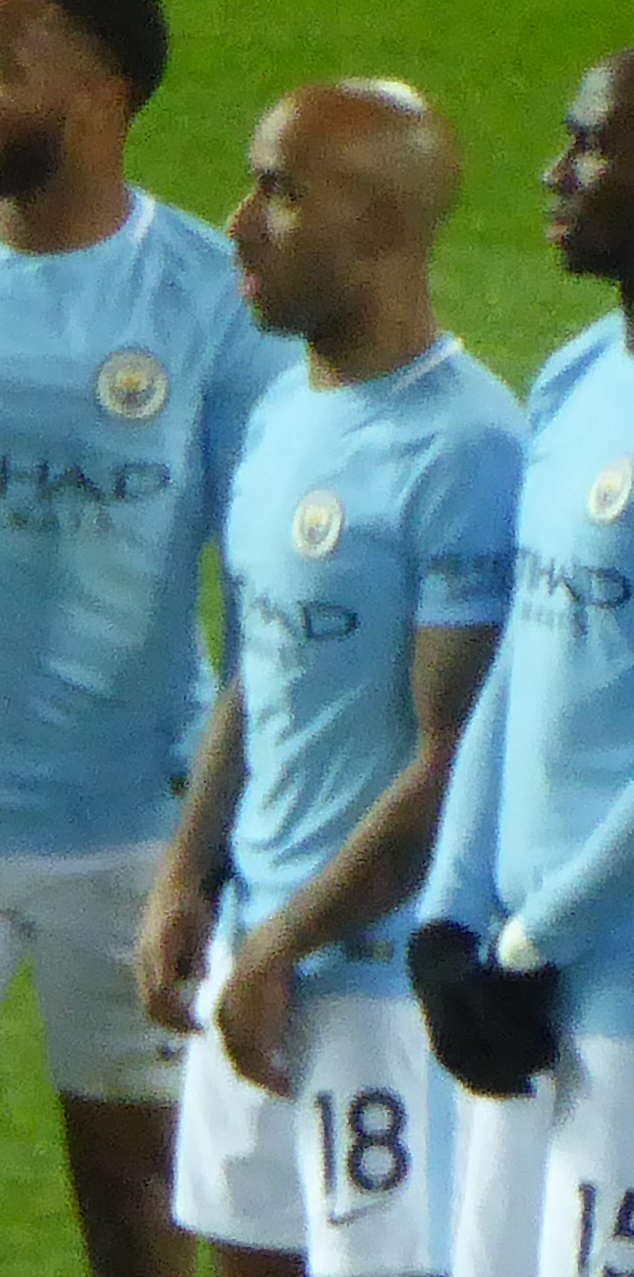
Delph playing for Manchester City in 2017

On 17 July 2015, Delph signed a five-year contract with Premier League club Manchester City for a reported fee of £8 million, just six days after saying he would be staying at Aston Villa to captain them into the next season. He made his debut a week later against Real Madrid in the 2015 International Champions Cup at the Melbourne Cricket ground, but was substituted after 18 minutes for Jesús Navas due to injury, and City lost 1–4. Delph scored his first goal for Manchester City on 28 November 2015 against Southampton, the second in an eventual 3–1 win. His third goal for the club came in a 1–0 win over Steaua Bucharest in a Champions League qualifier in August 2016.

After an injury to Benjamin Mendy, Delph established himself as Manchester City's starting left-back in the first half of the team's record breaking start to the 2017–18 season. He started 14 consecutive matches in the Premier League, scoring once against Crystal Palace, as City set a new record of 18 consecutive league wins. He was sent off in the FA Cup defeat to Wigan Athletic in February 2018 and then suffered a muscle problem, not returning to fitness until April.

=== Everton ===
Delph signed for Everton on 15 July 2019 on a three-year contract for an initial fee of £8.5 million, rising to £10 million in add-ons. On 10 June 2022, the BBC reported he would leave the club at the end of the month once his contract expired.

On 27 September 2022, Delph announced his retirement from professional football.

== International career ==
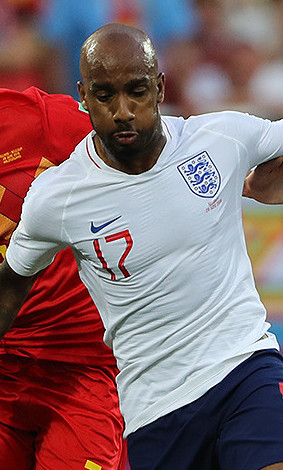
Delph playing for England at the 2018 FIFA World Cup

In March 2008, Delph started his international career, making his debut as a substitute for the England national under-19 team.

On 28 August 2014, Delph was named in the senior England squad for the first time, ahead of a friendly against Norway and the first Euro 2016 qualifier against Switzerland. He made his international debut in the friendly against Norway on 3 September 2014, coming on as a 69th-minute substitute for Alex Oxlade-Chamberlain as England won 1–0. Five days later, in England's first match of UEFA Euro 2016 qualification, Delph made his first start and played the entirety of a 2–0 victory away to Switzerland at St. Jakob-Park, Basel. On 16 May 2016, Delph was announced to have been selected for the provisional UEFA Euro 2016 England squad. However, on 26 May he was ruled out of the tournament with a groin injury.

Delph was named in the 23-man squad for the 2018 FIFA World Cup. He made his World Cup debut against Panama, coming on as a 63rd-minute substitute in a 6–1 win. He played the full 90 minutes of the final group game, against Belgium.

Prior to his competitive debut for England, Delph was also eligible to represent Guyana through his ancestry.

== Personal life ==
On 23 December 2008, Delph was arrested by police and charged for drink driving in Rothwell, Leeds, while driving home with four friends. He pleaded guilty at Leeds Magistrates' Court to the charge of driving whilst over the limit; he was fined £1,400, disqualified from driving for 18 months and ordered to pay costs of £60.

He has three daughters, the youngest of whom was born during the 2018 World Cup.

== Career statistics ==
=== Club ===
Appearances and goals by club, season and competition
Club	Season	League			FA Cup		League Cup		Europe		Other		Total	
Club	Season	Division	Apps	Goals	Apps	Goals	Apps	Goals	Apps	Goals	Apps	Goals	Apps	Goals
Leeds United	2006–07	Championship	1	0	0	0	0	0	—		—		1	0
Leeds United	2007–08	League One	1	0	0	0	1	0	—		0	0	2	0
Leeds United	2008–09	League One	42	6	2	0	4	0	—		3 (Note: One appearance in Football League Trophy, two appearances in League One play-offs)	0	51	6
Leeds United	Total		44	6	2	0	5	0	—		3	0	54	6
Aston Villa	2009–10	Premier League	8	0	4	1	2	0	1 (Note: Appearance in UEFA Europa League)	0	—		15	1
Aston Villa	2010–11	Premier League	7	0	1	0	0	0	0	0	—		8	0
Aston Villa	2011–12	Premier League	11	0	0	0	0	0	—		—		11	0
Aston Villa	2012–13	Premier League	24	0	2	0	6	1	—		—		32	1
Aston Villa	2013–14	Premier League	34	3	1	0	1	1	—		—		36	4
Aston Villa	2014–15	Premier League	28	0	4	2	0	0	—		—		32	2
Aston Villa	Total		112	3	12	3	9	2	1	0	—		134	8
Leeds United (loan)	2011–12	Championship	5	0	—		—		—		—		5	0
Manchester City	2015–16	Premier League	17	2	2	0	3	0	5 (Note: Appearance(s) in UEFA Champions League)	0	—		27	2
Manchester City	2016–17	Premier League	7	1	5	0	0	0	1	1	—		13	2
Manchester City	2017–18	Premier League	22	1	1	0	1	0	5	0	—		29	1
Manchester City	2018–19	Premier League	11	0	1	0	2	0	6	0	0	0	20	0
Manchester City	Total		57	4	9	0	6	0	17	1	0	0	89	5
Everton	2019–20	Premier League	16	0	1	0	3	0	—		—		20	0
Everton	2020–21	Premier League	8	0	0	0	2	0	—		—		10	0
Everton	2021–22	Premier League	11	0	0	0	0	0	—		—		11	0
Everton	Total		35	0	1	0	5	0	—		—		41	0
Career total			253	13	24	3	25	2	18	1	3	0	323	19

=== International ===
Appearances and goals by national team and year
National team	Year	Apps	Goals
England	2014	3	0
England	2015	6	0
England	2018	9	0
England	2019	2	0
Total		20	0

== Honours ==
Aston Villa

- FA Cup runner-up: 2014–15
- Football League Cup runner-up: 2009–10

Manchester City

- Premier League: 2017–18, 2018–19

England

- UEFA Nations League third place: 2018–19

Individual

- PFA Team of the Year: 2008–09 League One
- PFA League One Player of the Month: November 2008, January 2009
- Football League One Young Player of the Year: 2008–09
- Leeds United Players Player of the Year: 2008–09
- Leeds United Young Player of the Year: 2008–09
- Leeds United Goal of the Season: 2008–09
- Aston Villa Fan's Player of the Year: 2013–14
- Aston Villa Player of the Year: 2013–14, 2014–15
- Aston Villa Player's Player of the Year: 2013–14
- Aston Villa Goal of the Year: 2013–14
