= 2013–14 Aston Villa F.C. season =

English football club season

Aston Villa
2013–14 season
- Owner: Reform Acquisitions LLC
- Chairman: Randy Lerner
- Manager: Paul Lambert
- Stadium: Villa Park
- Premier League: 15th
- FA Cup: Third round
- League Cup: Third round
- Top goalscorer: League: Christian Benteke (10); All: Christian Benteke (11)
Home colours	Away colours	Third colours

The 2013-14 season was Aston Villa's 22nd season in the Premier League. It was the club's 103rd season; and their 26th consecutive season in the top flight. The club was managed by Paul Lambert, in his second season in charge. It was the last season in which Aston Villa did not receive a single red card.

Lambert's side began the season brightly, with a 3–1 win over Arsenal at Emirates Stadium on 17 August. Towards the end of 2013, the performances worsened greatly, especially home form, and Lambert was criticised by many fans and pundits for putting out a counter-attacking side with no plan B. Possession stats were biased towards the opposition in many games, including at home to Swansea; Villa had less than 30 per cent of possession in a game which ended 1–1.

In the new year Villa lost 2–1 at home to Sheffield United, a team two divisions below them, marking the fourth consecutive year that Lambert has been eliminated from the FA Cup by lower league opposition. Lambert made headlines by claiming that "many Premier League clubs could do without the distraction of the FA Cup if they were being honest." He subsequently defended his comments, claiming they were "taken out of context."

There were debuts for Jack Grealish (185), Leandro Bacuna (116), Jores Okore (38), Libor Kozák (20), Jed Steer (19), Antonio Luna (17), Aleksandar Tonev (17), Ryan Bertrand (16), Grant Holt (10), Callum Robinson (4), Nicklas Helenius (3), and Janoi Donacien.

== Pre-season ==
The club announced its pre-season plans would begin with a tour of Germany. The tour took place between 10 and 14 July 2013 and saw Villa play three games against SV Rodinghausen,
SC Paderborn and VfL Bochum, all which finished 1–1. The club then returned to England to play four more games against Wycombe Wanderers (finished 2–2), Luton Town
(finished 2–0 to Luton), Crewe Alexandra (finished 5–1 to Villa) and Walsall (finished 5–0 to Villa). The penultimate pre-season game saw Villa travel to the Republic of Ireland for a match against Shamrock Rovers (finished 2–0 to Villa), before a match at Villa Park against Málaga (finished 3–2 to Villa), completed the schedule.

The Premier League fixtures were announced on 19 June, and Villa faced Arsenal at the Emirates Stadium in the first game of the season on 17 August. Coincidentally, this repeated the opening day fixture of the 2006–07 season. Villa then hosted Liverpool a week later in their first top flight home game of the season. The first West Midlands derby of the season, against West Bromwich Albion, was played at The Hawthorns on 23 November, with the return game at Villa Park taking place on 28 January 2014. Villa faced the first of the promoted clubs on 5 October, with a game against Hull City at the KC Stadium. Games against Cardiff City and Crystal Palace take place at Villa Park on 9 November and 26 December respectively.

=== Transfer summary ===
On 7 June, Bulgarian winger Aleksandar Tonev agreed to join the club from Lech Poznań, with the fee rumoured at £2.5 million, to become their first signing of the summer. On 13 June, Villa continued recruiting players early as they signed both Jores Okore and Leandro Bacuna from Nordsjælland and Groningen respectively. Okore, a 20-year-old Danish international, stated
"I want to bring something new to our game and really help the team into a new era.' He also acknowledged 'we have a good coach and this is a really good club. This is the right club for me, I feel it straight away." Upon his arrival, Bacuna said, "It's a new beginning for me, a new step and I'm looking forward to being part of this young, hungry team we have at Villa." Villa's fourth signing was confirmed five days later, as Nicklas Helenius signed a three-year deal and they then completed their fifth signing with left-back Antonio Luna sealing a move on
20 June. On 26 June, the club announced they had agreed a deal with Norwich City to sign goalkeeper Jed Steer to serve as back-up to Brad Guzan. The 20-year-old will join on a free transfer on 1 July.

It was announced that Jean Makoun would be the first player to leave Villa in the summer, as Rennes made his loan move from the previous season permanent on 30 March 2013.
The player officially left on 1 July. On 5 June, Richard Dunne, Eric Lichaj and Andy Marshall left the club after being released from the first-team as their contracts had expired.
Four academy players: Callum Barrett, Daniel Devine, Josh Barton and Courtney Cameron were also released. Additionally, Simon Dawkins returned to Tottenham Hotspur after his loan had finished. On 22 June, the club confirmed that Brett Holman's contract had been terminated by mutual consent, freeing the player to join UAE team Al-Nasr. Young defender
Derrick Williams became the next player to leave the club, after he turned down a new deal with Villa to join Bristol City.

On 8 July, reports surfaced that Christian Benteke had handed in a transfer request at Villa. This was later confirmed by the club, who stated that he will be allowed to leave if a suitable offer is made "within an appropriate timeframe". Just 11 days later (19 July), Benteke made a U-turn and withdrew his transfer request, simultaneously signing a new four-year deal with club.
On 8 August, after signing a new contract in the summer, 19-year-old forward Graham Burke joined Shrewsbury Town on loan until January 2014. Two days later (10 August), the last season's NextGen captain, Samir Carruthers, joined League One side Milton Keynes Dons on loan until January. On 16 August, record signing Darren Bent joined Fulham on an initial season-long loan. Nathan Delfouneso re-joined Blackpool on loan, until 1 January, on the same day.

On transfer deadline day Villa signed Czech forward Libor Kozák, the top scorer in the 2012–13 UEFA Europa League, from Lazio. He joined on a four-year deal for an undisclosed fee, rumoured to be between £5–7 million. Barry Bannan left the club, after nine years, to join Crystal Palace for an undisclosed fee and Stephen Ireland joined Stoke City on a season-long loan.

== August ==
Month	Games	Won	Drew	Lost	Scored	Conceded	Points	Other
August	4	2	0	2	7	4	3	Progression to League Cup third round

The draw for the 2013–14 League Cup second round took place on 8 August. Villa faced Rotherham United of League One at Villa Park, on 28 August.

Villa began the season with a 1–3 away win over Arsenal at Emirates Stadium, becoming the first team to beat the Gunners on the opening day in 13 years. Olivier Giroud sent the hosts into an early lead, but a Christian Benteke double and a debut goal for Antonio Luna gave Villa the victory. Four days later, Villa faced Chelsea at Stamford Bridge in a rescheduled fixture. Chelsea won 2–1 but the match saw two controversial refereeing decisions go against Villa. The first involved Branislav Ivanović (who went on to score the winner in the 73rd minute) escaping a sending off for an elbow on Christian Benteke and the second a late penalty being denied, after the ball had hit John Terry on the arm. The first game of the season at Villa Park, and also the club's third game in seven days, was against Liverpool, where a first half Daniel Sturridge goal gave the away side a 0–1 win. On 28 August, Villa made it through to the League Cup third round after beating Rotherham United 3–0. The match was also the first time in 30 competitive outings that Villa had kept a clean sheet. Villa then drew Tottenham, played on 24 September.

Pos	Team	Pld	W	D	L	GF	GA	GD	Pts
11	Cardiff City	3	1	1	1	3	4	−1	4
12	Newcastle United	3	1	1	1	1	4	−3	4
13	Aston Villa	3	1	0	2	4	4	0	3
14	Crystal Palace	3	1	0	2	4	4	0	3
15	Everton	3	0	3	0	2	2	0	3

Updated to match(es) played on 31 August 2013. Source: Barclays Premier League
Rules for classification: 1) points; 2) goal difference; 3) number of goals scored.

== September ==
Month	Games	Won	Drew	Lost	Scored	Conceded	Points	Other
September	4	2	0	2	5	7	6	Eliminated from League Cup

Villa's first game after the international break ended up in a defeat to Newcastle United. Newcastle won the match 2–1, with goals from Hatem Ben Arfa and Yoan Gouffran cancelling out
Christian Benteke's equaliser. It was later confirmed that defender Jores Okore had sustained a ruptured anterior cruciate ligament injury during the match, and would be out for up to nine months. The next match saw Paul Lambert win again at Carrow Road against former club Norwich City, as Villa ran out 1–0 winners. Libor Kozák got the winner, his first goal for the club, just seconds after replacing the injured Benteke. It also marked the first time in 26 league matches that Villa had kept a clean sheet. Three days later, it was confirmed that Benteke would be out for up to six weeks with a hip flexor injury. The day after the confirmation of Benteke's injury (26 September), Villa were eliminated from the League Cup after being beaten 0–4 by Tottenham. Villa had gone into the match with eight first team players out injured. However the result didn't dishearten the players, as the next match resulted in a 3–2 win against Manchester City. City had twice led through Yaya Touré and Edin Džeko but goals from Karim El Ahmadi, Leandro Bacuna and Andreas Weimann saw Villa earn their first points at home of the season.

Pos	Team	Pld	W	D	L	GF	GA	GD	Pts
7	Manchester City	6	3	1	2	14	7	+7	10
8	Hull City	6	3	1	2	6	7	−1	10
9	Aston Villa	6	3	0	3	9	8	+1	9
10	West Bromwich Albion	6	2	2	2	6	5	+1	8
11	Cardiff City	6	2	2	2	6	7	−1	8

Updated to match(es) played on 30 September 2013. Source: Barclays Premier League
Rules for classification: 1) points; 2) goal difference; 3) number of goals scored.

== October ==
Month	Games	Won	Drew	Lost	Scored	Conceded	Points
October	3	0	1	2	0	4	1

An uneventful 0–0 draw at Hull City followed the Manchester City victory, as Villa recorded their first draw and second clean sheet of the season. After a two-week international break, Villa returned to league action against Tottenham Hotspur. The game finished 0–2 to Spurs, after goals from Andros Townsend and Roberto Soldado. Christian Benteke made his comeback from injury after coming on as a 61st-minute substitute. This defeat was followed by another, again at home, as Everton left Villa Park with three points courtesy of a 2–0 win. Benteke had a first half penalty saved by Tim Howard and Villa were made to rue this missed opportunity, as two second half goals from Romelu Lukaku and Leon Osman sealed an Everton victory.

Pos	Team	Pld	W	D	L	GF	GA	GD	Pts
12	Fulham	8	3	1	4	9	10	−1	10
13	West Bromwich Albion	9	2	4	3	8	10	−2	10
14	Aston Villa	9	3	1	5	9	12	−3	10
15	Cardiff City	9	2	3	4	8	13	−5	9
16	West Ham United	8	2	2	4	8	8	0	8

Updated to match(es) played on 27 October 2013. Source: Barclays Premier League
Rules for classification: 1) points; 2) goal difference; 3) number of goals scored.

== November ==
Month	Games	Won	Drew	Lost	Scored	Conceded	Points
November	4	1	3	0	4	2	6

A 0–0 draw against West Ham United extended Villa's winless, and goalless, run to four games. This run was eventually ended in the next match with a 2–0 victory over Cardiff City at Villa Park. Leandro Bacuna and Libor Kozák both scored their second goals for the club and Villa kept their first clean sheet at home for 17 games, as well as first back-to-back clean sheets since November 2012. Villa returned to action, after another international break, in the first West Midlands derby of the season against West Bromwich Albion. West Brom raced into a 2–0 lead within 11 minutes after two goals from Shane Long but Villa responded in the second half as Karim El Ahmadi pulled one back. Ashley Westwood then rescued a point for Villa with a goal from 25-yards out, his first for the club, as the match finished 2–2. Villa finished the month with a 0–0 draw against Sunderland at Villa Park.

Pos	Team	Pld	W	D	L	GF	GA	GD	Pts
9	Tottenham Hotspur	13	6	3	4	11	14	−3	21
10	Hull City	13	5	2	6	12	16	−4	17
11	Aston Villa	13	4	4	5	13	14	−1	16
12	West Bromwich Albion	13	3	6	4	15	16	−1	15
13	Swansea City	13	4	3	6	17	19	−2	15

Updated to match(es) played on 1 December 2013. Source: Barclays Premier League
Rules for classification: 1) points; 2) goal difference; 3) number of goals scored.

== December ==
Month	Games	Won	Drew	Lost	Scored	Conceded	Points
December	6	1	1	4	5	11	4

Villa produced a great result in their first game of December, by beating Southampton 2–3 at St Mary's. Southampton twice equalised after Villa had led through Gabriel Agbonlahor's first goal of the season and then a Libor Kozák header. Fabian Delph grabbed the winner ten minutes from time with a 25-yard strike, his first ever Premier League goal. However four days later Villa suffered only their second away defeat of the season, after a disappointing performance in an eventual 2–0 defeat against Fulham. On the same day, Villa drew Sheffield United in the third round of the FA Cup. Manchester United were the visitors in the next game, and they left Villa Park with all three points after a 0–3 victory. A brace from Danny Welbeck and a third from Tom Cleverley gave the champions their first win in four games. Villa then slipped to a third consecutive defeat as they were beaten 2–1 by Stoke City at the Britannia Stadium. Charlie Adam and Peter Crouch scored either side of Libor Kozák's fourth of the season. The traditional Boxing Day fixture saw Villa face Crystal Palace at Villa Park and resulted in a fourth straight defeat for the Claret and Blues. The match looked as though it would end in stalemate, however Eagles' substitute Dwight Gayle fired in a 92nd-minute winner. Villa eventually stopped the rot with a 1–1 draw against Swansea City, in their last game of 2013. Gabriel Agbonlahor gave Villa an early lead but Roland Lamah equalised for the Swans before half-time, as it finished all square.

Pos	Team	Pld	W	D	L	GF	GA	GD	Pts
11	Stoke City	19	5	6	8	18	29	−11	21
12	Swansea City	19	5	6	8	24	25	−1	21
13	Aston Villa	19	5	5	9	18	25	−7	20
14	Norwich City	19	5	4	10	16	32	−16	19
15	West Bromwich Albion	19	3	9	7	22	27	−5	18

Updated to match(es) played on 29 December 2013. Source: Barclays Premier League
Rules for classification: 1) points; 2) goal difference; 3) number of goals scored.

== January ==
Month	Games	Won	Drew	Lost	Scored	Conceded	Points	Other
January	5	2	1	2	9	9	6	Eliminated from FA Cup

Villa started the new year with victory over Sunderland at the Stadium of Light. Gabriel Agbonlahor scored the only goal, repeating the outcome of the match the season before. However, Villa were then knocked out of the FA Cup by a lower league team for a second consecutive season. This time it was Sheffield United who condemned Villa to defeat, after winning 2–1 at Villa Park. The defeat came days after it was revealed that striker Libor Kozák would miss the rest of the season after breaking his leg in training. The next match saw the same result for Villa, as Arsenal ran out 2–1 winners at Villa Park. Arsenal all but wrapped up the win before half time, after two goals in a minute from Jack Wilshere and Olivier Giroud. Christian Benteke ensured a nervy end for Arsenal, with his first goal since September, but they held on for all three points. Villa earned a point at Anfield next, despite leading Liverpool 2–0 at one point. The Merseysiders equalised through goals from Daniel Sturridge and a Steven Gerrard penalty, after Andreas Weimann and Christian Benteke had put Villa two goals to the good.
Villa followed up their impressive performance against Liverpool, with a 4–3 win in a pulsating derby with West Bromwich Albion. Albion had gone 2–0 up in the first nine minutes but, just as at
The Hawthorns earlier in the season, Villa fought back to 2–2. Fabian Delph then put Villa into the lead with a wonder–strike, before Youssouf Mulumbu again drew the teams level before half-time. Christian Benteke then won and converted a penalty, his third goal in successive matches, which won it for Villa.

Villa made their first January signing on 14 January, when Grant Holt joined on loan from Wigan Athletic until the end of the season. Three days later Villa brought in a second player on loan, in left-back Ryan Bertrand from Chelsea.

Stephen Ireland left the club after three and a half years, as his loan move to Stoke City was made permanent on 14 January. On 30 January, Nathan Delfouneso left the club on loan for the second time of the season, joining Coventry City.

Pos	Team	Pld	W	D	L	GF	GA	GD	Pts
8	Newcastle United	23	11	4	8	32	28	+4	37
9	Southampton	23	8	8	7	31	27	+4	32
10	Aston Villa	23	7	6	10	26	32	−6	27
11	Swansea City	23	6	6	11	29	32	−3	24
12	Norwich City	23	6	6	11	18	36	−18	24

Updated to match(es) played on 29 January 2014. Source: Barclays Premier League
Rules for classification: 1) points; 2) goal difference; 3) number of goals scored.

== February ==
Month	Games	Won	Drew	Lost	Scored	Conceded	Points
February	4	0	1	3	1	5	1

Villa could not continue their good form into their next match, as they went down 1–2 at Everton. Leandro Bacuna had given Villa the lead but the Toffees emerged victorious after goals from Steven Naismith and Kevin Mirallas. Villa then proceeded to lose their eighth league match at home, after a 0–2 defeat to West Ham United, courtesy of two goals in two minutes from Kevin Nolan. Another disappointing result followed as despite a number of clear-cut goalscoring opportunities, Villa had to settle for a 0–0 draw at Cardiff City. Villa then lost their last game of February, 1–0 against Newcastle United, meaning they only acquired one point from a possible 12 in the month. This left Villa just four points off the relegation places, despite them lying in 13th place.

Pos	Team	Pld	W	D	L	GF	GA	GD	Pts
11	Hull City	27	8	6	13	29	31	−2	30
12	Swansea City	27	7	7	13	36	40	−4	28
13	Aston Villa	27	7	7	13	27	37	−10	28
14	Norwich City	27	7	7	13	20	39	−19	28
15	Stoke City	27	6	9	12	27	42	−15	27

Updated to match(es) played on 24 February 2014. Source: Barclays Premier League
Rules for classification: 1) points; 2) goal difference; 3) number of goals scored.

== March ==
Month	Games	Won	Drew	Lost	Scored	Conceded	Points
March	4	2	0	2	7	9	6

Villa somewhat made amends for their poor results in February, with a 4–1 home win against Norwich City in their first match of March. First half goals from Christian Benteke (2), Leandro Bacuna and an own goal from Sébastien Bassong gave Villa the victory, after Wes Hoolahan had given Norwich an early lead. Villa followed the victory with another, this time against league leaders Chelsea. Fabian Delph scored the only goal with a deft flick, in a match where Chelsea finished with nine men after having Willian and Ramires sent off, as well as manager José Mourinho being sent to the stands late on. The result also marked the first time in three and a half years that Villa had won consecutive home games. However Villa's season-long inconsistency, especially at home, continued in their next match as they went down 1–4 to Stoke City. It looked as though Villa would continue where they left off in their last match, as Christian Benteke gave them the lead in the first five minutes. However three first half goals from Peter Odemwingie, Peter Crouch and Steven Nzonzi effectively ended the match as a contest, before Geoff Cameron ensured that Villa's home resurgence was abruptly ended. Villa lost by the same margin in their next match, this time against Manchester United. Ashley Westwood had scored a free-kick to give Villa an early lead but United had turned it around by half time, courtesy of two Wayne Rooney goals. In the second half, goals from Juan Mata and Javier Hernández condemned Villa to a consecutive 1–4 defeat.

Pos	Team	Pld	W	D	L	GF	GA	GD	Pts
10	Stoke City	32	10	10	12	37	45	−8	40
11	West Ham United	31	9	7	15	34	41	−7	34
12	Aston Villa	31	9	7	15	34	46	−12	34
13	Swansea City	32	8	9	15	45	48	−3	33
14	Hull City	32	9	6	17	33	40	−7	33

Updated to match(es) played on 29 March 2014. Source: Barclays Premier League
Rules for classification: 1) points; 2) goal difference; 3) number of goals scored.

== April ==
Month	Games	Won	Drew	Lost	Scored	Conceded	Points
April	4	0	1	3	2	7	1

On 3 April, news broke that Christian Benteke would be out for "a minimum of six months" with a ruptured Achilles tendon injury. The injury, that occurred in training, will rule the Belgian out of the rest of Villa's season as well as the 2014 FIFA World Cup. It didn't get any better for Villa as their next match again ended in defeat at home, this time to bottom club Fulham. The visitors took the lead before Grant Holt equalised with his first goal for the club, however Hugo Rodallega gave Fulham a survival lifeline with an 86th-minute winner. A further loss followed, this time against Crystal Palace. A Jason Puncheon strike gave Palace a 1–0 victory and saw Villa lose their fourth game in a row, resulting in them being just four points above the relegation zone. Villa's poor run culminated in the suspensions of assistant manager Ian Culverhouse and head of football operations Gary Karsa, pending an internal investigation. Development team coach Gordon Cowans and veteran goalkeeper Shay Given were both promoted to interim co-assistant manager as a result. Villa eventually stopped the rot, as well as putting a nightmare week behind them, with a 0–0 draw against Southampton at Villa Park. The next match, however, saw Villa slump to defeat yet again, this time 4–1 at Swansea, leaving them still in the thick of a fourth consecutive relegation battle.

Pos	Team	Pld	W	D	L	GF	GA	GD	Pts	Qualification
14	West Ham United	36	10	7	19	38	49	−11	37	
15	West Bromwich Albion	35	7	15	13	42	54	−12	36	
16	Aston Villa	35	9	8	18	36	53	−17	35	
17	Norwich City	35	8	8	19	28	56	−28	32	
18	Fulham	36	9	4	23	37	79	−42	31	2014–15 Football League Championship

Updated to match(es) played on 26 April 2014. Source: Barclays Premier League
Rules for classification: 1) points; 2) goal difference; 3) number of goals scored.

== May ==
Month	Games	Won	Drew	Lost	Scored	Conceded	Points
May	3	1	0	2	3	8	3

Villa eventually ended their six match winless run on the back of beating Hull City 3–1. This result saw the club all but guarantee their Premier League safety, due to their far superior goal difference over Norwich, the team occupying the remaining relegation place. Ashley Westwood scored after 56 seconds and Andreas Weimann got a brace before half time, after Jordan Bowery had put through his own net. However Villa ended a miserable season with a whimper, after two heavy defeats in four days. Villa travelled to the City of Manchester Stadium on 7 May for their rescheduled game versus Manchester City in their penultimate match of the season. The eventual champions thrashed Villa 4–0, after the visitors had held out for an hour. Edin Džeko scored a brace before goals from Stevan Jovetić and Yaya Touré effectively wrapped up the title for City, who needed just a point from their final game against West Ham (which they won 2–0) to win the league. The season was wrapped up with a 3–0 defeat against Tottenham, which saw Villa finish in 15th place for the second season running.

On 12 May 2014, chairman Randy Lerner released a statement confirming that the club was up for sale. In the statement, Lerner stated, "I have come to know well that fates are fickle in the business of English football. And I feel that I have pushed mine well past the limit." He also said that "the last several seasons have been week in, week out battles", and claimed that he "can see now that it is time, if possible, to hand these privileges and responsibilities to the next person or group to take the Club forward". This statement came after weeks of speculation about a possible decision to sell the club, after another statement from Lerner alluding to this at the end of April.

Pos	Team	Pld	W	D	L	GF	GA	GD	Pts	Qualification
13	West Ham United	38	11	7	20	40	51	−11	40	
14	Sunderland	38	10	8	20	41	60	−19	38	
15	Aston Villa	38	10	8	20	39	61	−22	38	
16	Hull City	38	10	7	21	31	53	−22	37	2014–15 UEFA Europa League
17	West Bromwich Albion	38	7	15	16	43	59	−16	36	

Updated to match(es) played on 11 May 2014. Source: Barclays Premier League
Rules for classification: 1) points; 2) goal difference; 3) number of goals scored.

== Key events ==
- 30 March 2013: Jean Makoun agrees a move to Rennes on a permanent basis; he will officially join on 1 July.
- 5 June: Richard Dunne, Eric Lichaj and Andy Marshall are released from the club.
- 7 June: Aleksandar Tonev agrees to join the club from Lech Poznań. Nathan Baker signs a new three-year deal with the club.
- 10 June: Andreas Weimann signs a new three-year contract with Villa until 2016.
- 13 June: Villa sign 20-year-old Danish defender Jores Okore from Nordsjælland, as well as Leandro Bacuna from Groningen. Also, Daniel Johnson signs a new two–year contract.
- 18 June: Nicklas Helenius joins Villa from Aalborg BK.
- 20 June: Villa make their fifth signing as Antonio Luna joins from Sevilla.
- 21 June: Charles N'Zogbia suffers an Achilles tendon injury, which was originally intended to see him out of action until around January. However, by March, N'Zogbia had still not returned to action and it was revealed that he was unlikely to return during the season.
- 22 June: Brett Holman's contract is terminated by mutual consent, with the player joining Al Nasr in the UAE.
- 24 June: Derrick Williams leaves the club and joins Bristol City.
- 26 June: Villa agree a deal with Norwich City for goalkeeper Jed Steer, with the player joining on a free transfer on 1 July.
- 1 July: Graham Burke, Samir Carruthers and Michael Drennan all sign new two-year deals.
- 6 July: Brad Guzan signs a new four-year deal until 2017.
- 8 July: Christian Benteke hands in a transfer request.
- 15 July: Ashley Westwood signs a new four-year contract with Villa, after impressing in his first season at the club.
- 18 July: Ciaran Clark becomes the next player to sign a new deal, agreeing a three-year contract with the club.
- 19 July: Christian Benteke withdraws his transfer request as well as signing a new four-year deal with the club. Matthew Lowton also agrees a new four-year deal until 2017.
- 8 August: Villa draw Rotherham United in the 2013–14 League Cup second round. Also, young forward Graham Burke joins Shrewsbury Town on loan until January.
- 10 August: Samir Carruthers joins Milton Keynes Dons on loan until January.
- 16 August: Darren Bent and Nathan Delfouneso both leave on loan, joining Fulham and Blackpool respectively.
- 17 August: Villa win their opening fixture 3–1 against Arsenal at the Emirates.
- 27 August: Third choice left-back Enda Stevens joins Notts County on a 28-day emergency loan.
- 28 August: Villa beat Rotherham United 3–0 in the League Cup second round. They draw Tottenham Hotspur in the third round.
- 2 September: On deadline day, Villa sign forward Libor Kozák and allow Barry Bannan and Stephen Ireland to leave on permanent and loan deals respectively.
- 16 September: Jores Okore is confirmed as out of action for up to nine months, after sustaining a ruptured anterior cruciate ligament injury in the game against Newcastle United.
- 24 September: Villa are knocked out of the League Cup after a 0–4 loss to Tottenham Hotspur. Top scorer Christian Benteke is ruled out for up to six weeks with a hip flexor injury.
- 28 September: Villa earn their first home points of the season, by beating Manchester City 3–2.
- 30 October: Winger Marc Albrighton joins Wigan Athletic on a 28-day loan.
- 9 November: Villa end a run of four games without winning, or scoring, with a 2–0 victory over Cardiff City. It is also their first home league clean sheet of the season.
- 28 November: Shay Given and Enda Stevens both leave on emergency loans to Middlesbrough and Doncaster Rovers respectively.
- 8 December: Villa draw Sheffield United in the third round of the FA Cup.
- 28 December: Villa end 2013 in 13th place in the Premier League after a 1–1 draw against Swansea City.
- 2 January 2014: Libor Kozák is ruled out for the rest of the season after breaking his leg.
- 4 January: Villa are knocked out of the FA Cup by Sheffield United.
- 14 January: Grant Holt joins the club on loan from Wigan until the end of the season. Stephen Ireland permanently joins Stoke City.
- 17 January: Ryan Bertrand joins on loan from Chelsea until the end of the season.
- 29 January: Villa come from 0–2 down to beat local rivals West Bromwich Albion 4–3 at Villa Park.
- 15 March: Villa beat Chelsea 1–0 at Villa Park, marking the first time they had won back-to-back at home since 2010.
- 3 April: Christian Benteke is ruled out of the rest of the season, as well as the 2014 FIFA World Cup, with a ruptured Achilles tendon injury. He will be out for a minimum of six months.
- 15 April: Assistant manager Ian Culverhouse and head of football operations Gary Karsa are suspended by the club, being replaced by Gordon Cowans and Shay Given as interim co-assistant managers.
- 3 May: Villa all but secure their Premier League status, due to a superior goal difference, after a 3–1 victory over Hull City.
- 11 May: Villa finish in 15th place for the second season running after a 3–0 defeat to Tottenham on the final day.
- 12 May: After weeks of speculation, Randy Lerner confirms that the club is up for sale.

== Players ==
=== Squad information ===
In the 2010–11 season, the Premier League introduced new rules on squad lists. The rules included a cap on the number of players at 25; players under the age of 21 on 1 January of the year in which the season starts are exempt from the list of 25. A "home-grown rule" also requires clubs to name at least eight players in their squad of 25 players that have been registered domestically for a minimum of three seasons prior to their 21st birthday.

Players under 21 do not need to be named and can still be used. Squad subject to change during summer transfer window.

==== First team squad ====
Source
Last updated on 12 May 2014.

Squad No.	Name	Nationality	Position	Date of birth (age)	Signed from	Signed in	Contract ends	Apps.	Goals	Notes
Goalkeepers
1	Brad Guzan	(United States)	GK	9 September 1984 (aged 28)	Chivas USA	2012	2017	94	0	
13	Jed Steer	(England)	GK	23 September 1992 (aged 20)	Norwich City	2013	N/A	3	0	
31	Shay Given	(Republic of Ireland)	GK	20 April 1976 (aged 37)	Manchester City	2011	2016	43	0	Player Interim Co-Assistant Manager
Defenders
2	Nathan Baker	(England)	CB / LB	23 April 1991 (aged 22)	Aston Villa Academy	2009	2016	74	0	
3	Joe Bennett	(England)	LB	28 March 1990 (aged 23)	Middlesbrough	2012	2016	37	0	
4	Ron Vlaar (captain)	(Netherlands)	CB	16 February 1985 (aged 28)	Feyenoord	2012	2015	64	2	
5	Jores Okore	(Denmark)	CB	11 August 1992 (aged 20)	Nordsjælland	2013	2017	4	0	
6	Ciaran Clark	(Republic of Ireland)	CB / LB / DM	26 September 1989 (aged 23)	Aston Villa Academy	2009	2016	107	5	
14	Antonio Luna	(Spain)	LB / LW	17 March 1991 (aged 22)	Sevilla	2013	2016	18	1	
23	Ryan Bertrand	(England)	LB / LW	5 August 1989 (aged 23)	Chelsea	2014	2014	16	0	On loan from Chelsea
32	Janoi Donacien	(Saint Lucia)	CB / RB	3 November 1993 (aged 19)	Aston Villa Academy	2013	N/A	0	0	
34	Matthew Lowton	(England)	RB / CB	9 June 1989 (aged 24)	Sheffield United	2012	2017	69	2	
–	Enda Stevens	(Republic of Ireland)	LB	9 July 1990 (aged 23)	Shamrock Rovers	2012 (Winter)	2015	9	0	On loan at Doncaster
–	Alan Hutton	(Scotland)	RB	30 November 1984 (aged 28)	Tottenham Hotspur	2011	2015	34	0	On loan at Bolton
Midfielders
7	Leandro Bacuna	(Curaçao)	CM / AM / RW / RB	21 August 1991 (aged 21)	Groningen	2013	2016	37	5	
8	Karim El Ahmadi	(Morocco)	DM / CM	27 January 1985 (aged 28)	Feyenoord	2012	2015	55	3	
12	Marc Albrighton	(England)	LW / RW	18 November 1989 (aged 23)	Aston Villa Academy	2009	2014	101	9	
15	Ashley Westwood	(England)	CM	1 April 1990 (aged 23)	Crewe Alexandra	2012	2017	67	3	
16	Fabian Delph	(England)	CM	21 November 1989 (aged 23)	Leeds United	2009	2015	105	6	
17	Chris Herd	(Australia)	CM / CB / RB	4 April 1989 (aged 24)	Aston Villa Academy	2010	2015	42	2	
18	Yacouba Sylla	(Mali)	DM / CM	29 November 1990 (aged 22)	Clermont	2013 (Winter)	2016	24	0	
22	Gary Gardner	(England)	CM	29 June 1992 (aged 21)	Aston Villa Academy	2011	2014	18	0	
24	Aleksandar Tonev	(Bulgaria)	LW / RW	3 February 1990 (aged 23)	Lech Poznań	2013	2016	19	0	
25	Samir Carruthers	(Republic of Ireland)	LW	4 April 1993 (aged 20)	Aston Villa Academy	2012	2015	3	0	
36	Daniel Johnson	(Jamaica)	CM	8 October 1992 (aged 20)	Aston Villa Academy	2010	2015	0	0	
40	Jack Grealish	(England)	LW / RW / AM	10 September 1995 (aged 17)	Aston Villa Academy	2013	N/A	1	0	
–	Charles N'Zogbia	(France)	LW / RW / AM	28 May 1986 (aged 27)	Wigan Athletic	2011	2016	58	5	
Forwards
9	Nicklas Helenius	(Denmark)	ST / SS / RW	8 May 1991 (aged 22)	Aalborg BK	2013	2016	6	1	
10	Andreas Weimann	(Austria)	ST / SS / LW / RW	5 August 1991 (aged 21)	Aston Villa Academy	2010	2016	88	19	
11	Gabriel Agbonlahor	(England)	ST / SS / LW / RW	13 October 1986 (aged 26)	Aston Villa Academy	2005	2015	316	77	
20	Christian Benteke	(Belgium)	ST	3 December 1990 (aged 22)	Genk	2012	2017	67	34	
21	Jordan Bowery	(England)	ST	2 July 1991 (aged 22)	Chesterfield	2012	2015	22	0	
27	Libor Kozák	(Czech Republic)	ST	30 May 1989 (aged 24)	Lazio	2013	2017	15	4	
29	Grant Holt	(England)	ST	12 April 1981 (aged 32)	Wigan Athletic	2014	2014	10	1	On loan from Wigan Athletic
37	Callum Robinson	(England)	ST	2 February 1995 (aged 18)	Aston Villa Academy	2013	N/A	5	0	
38	Nathan Delfouneso	(England)	ST	2 February 1991 (aged 22)	Aston Villa Academy	2008	2014	44	9	
39	Darren Bent	(England)	ST	6 February 1984 (aged 29)	Sunderland	2011 (Winter)	2015	64	25	On loan at Fulham
–	Graham Burke	(Republic of Ireland)	ST	21 December 1993 (aged 19)	Aston Villa Academy	2012	2015	2	0	

=== Transfers ===
==== In ====
Summer

Date	Position	Player name	Club	League	Transfer fee	Notes	Source
7 June 2013	MF	(Bulgaria) Aleksandar Tonev	(Poland) Lech Poznań	(Poland) Ekstraklasa	£2.5M		
13 June 2013	DF	(Denmark) Jores Okore	(Denmark) Nordsjælland	(Denmark) Danish Superliga	£4M		
13 June 2013	MF	(Curaçao) Leandro Bacuna	(Netherlands) Groningen	(Netherlands) Eredivisie	£800,000	Fee according to Birmingham Mail article.	
18 June 2013	FW	(Denmark) Nicklas Helenius	(Denmark) Aalborg BK	(Denmark) Danish Superliga	£2M		
20 June 2013	DF	(Spain) Antonio Luna	(Spain) Sevilla	(Spain) La Liga	Undisclosed	Differing fees claimed by various sources.	
1 July 2013	GK	(England) Jed Steer	(England) Norwich City	(England) Premier League	£450,000 (compensation)	Transfer was announced on 26 June 2013. Compensation was decided on 17 January 2014.	
2 September 2013	FW	(Czech Republic) Libor Kozák	(Italy) Lazio	(Italy) Serie A	Undisclosed	Fee rumoured at between £5 and 7 million.	
3 April 2014	DF	(England) Isaac Nehemie	(England) Southampton	(England) Premier League	Free transfer	Academy player; joined after expiry of contract with Southampton.	
3 April 2014	DF	(England) Tom Leggett	(England) Southampton	(England) Premier League	Free transfer	Academy player; joined after expiry of contract with Southampton.	

==== Out ====
Summer

Date	Position	Player name	New club	League	Transfer fee	Notes	Source
5 June 2013	GK	(England) Andy Marshall	(England) Millwall	(England) Championship	Free transfer	Joined Millwall on 8/8/13, following release.	
5 June 2013	DF	(Republic of Ireland) Richard Dunne	(England) Queens Park Rangers	(England) Championship	Free transfer	Joined QPR on 15 July 2013, following release.	
5 June 2013	DF	(United States) Eric Lichaj	(England) Nottingham Forest	(England) Championship	Free transfer	Joined Forest on 19 June 2013, following release.	
7 June 2013	GK	(England) Calum Barrett	N/A	N/A	Released	Academy player	
7 June 2013	DF	(Republic of Ireland) Daniel Devine	N/A	N/A	Released	Academy player	
7 June 2013	MF	(Northern Ireland) Josh Barton	(Northern Ireland) Portadown	(Northern Ireland) NIFL Premiership	Free transfer	Academy player; joined Portadown on 29 October 2013, following release.	
7 June 2013	MF	(England) Courtney Cameron	(England) Torquay United	(England) League Two	Free transfer	Academy player; joined Torquay on 8/7/13, following release.	
22 June 2013	MF	(Australia) Brett Holman	(United Arab Emirates) Al Nasr	(United Arab Emirates) UAE Pro League	Free Transfer	Player's contract was terminated by mutual consent.	
24 June 2013	DF	(Republic of Ireland) Derrick Williams	(England) Bristol City	(England) League One	Free Transfer		
1 July 2013	MF	(Cameroon) Jean Makoun	(France) Rennes	(France) Ligue 1	Undisclosed	Transfer was announced on 30 March 2013.	
2 September 2013	MF	(Scotland) Barry Bannan	(England) Crystal Palace	(England) Premier League	Undisclosed		

Winter

Date	Position	Player name	New club	League	Transfer fee	Notes	Source
14 January 2014	MF	(Republic of Ireland) Stephen Ireland	(England) Stoke City	(England) Premier League	Undisclosed	Had been on loan at club until move was made permanent	

=== Loans ===
==== In ====
Winter

Date	Position	Player name	Club	League	Duration	Return Date	Source
14 January 2014	FW	(England) Grant Holt	(England) Wigan Athletic	(England) Championship	6 months	30 June 2014	
17 January 2014	DF	(England) Ryan Bertrand	(England) Chelsea	(England) Premier League	6 months	30 June 2014	

==== Out ====
Summer

Date	Position	Player name	New club	League	Duration	Return Date	Notes	Source
10 August 2013	MF	(Republic of Ireland) Samir Carruthers	(England) Milton Keynes Dons	(England) League One	8 months	3 April 2014	Initially a loan until January but was extended on 9/1/14.	
16 August 2013	FW	(England) Darren Bent	(England) Fulham	(England) Premier League	Season-long	30 June 2014		
16 August 2013	FW	(England) Nathan Delfouneso	(England) Blackpool	(England) Championship	5 months	1 January 2014		
27 August 2013	DF	(Republic of Ireland) Enda Stevens	(England) Notts County	(England) League One	28 days	24 September 2013	Emergency loan	
2 September 2013	FW	(Republic of Ireland) Stephen Ireland	(England) Stoke City	(England) Premier League	4 months	14 January 2014	Initially a season-long loan but was made permanent on 14 January 2014.	

Winter

Date	Position	Player name	New club	League	Duration	Return Date	Notes	Source
30 October 2013	MF	(England) Marc Albrighton	(England) Wigan Athletic	(England) Championship	28 days	27 November 2013		
28 November 2013	GK	(Republic of Ireland) Shay Given	(England) Middlesbrough	(England) Championship	3 months	28 February 2013	Initially a 28-day emergency loan but was extended on 31 December 2013.	
28 November 2013	DF	(Republic of Ireland) Enda Stevens	(England) Doncaster Rovers	(England) Championship	7 months	30 June 2014	Initially emergency loan but was extended to end of season on 31 January 2014.	
30 January 2014	FW	(England) Nathan Delfouneso	(England) Coventry City	(England) League One	6 months	30 June 2014		
12 February 2014	MF	(England) Gary Gardner	(England) Sheffield Wednesday	(England) Championship	1 month	12 March 2014	Emergency loan	
15 February 2014	FW	(England) Jordan Bowery	(England) Doncaster Rovers	(England) Championship	28 days	15 March 2014		
28 February 2014	DF	(Scotland) Alan Hutton	(England) Bolton Wanderers	(England) Championship	3 months	28 May 2014	Initially one-month loan but was extended until end of season on 31 March 2014.	

=== Squad number changes ===
Player	Position	Previous squad number	New squad number	Previous player to wear number	Notes	Source
(United States) Brad Guzan	GK	22	1	(Republic of Ireland) Shay Given (2012–13 season)		
(England) Nathan Baker	DF	32	2	(Scotland) Alan Hutton (2012–13 season)		
(England) Joe Bennett	DF	27	3	(England) Stephen Warnock (2012–13 season)	Squad number was vacant.	
(Denmark) Jores Okore	DF	N/A	5	(Republic of Ireland) Richard Dunne (2012–13 season)	Squad number was vacant.	
(Curaçao) Leandro Bacuna	MF	N/A	7	(Republic of Ireland) Stephen Ireland (2012–13 season)		
(Denmark) Nicklas Helenius	FW	N/A	9	(England) Darren Bent (2012–13 season)		
(Austria) Andreas Weimann	FW	26	10	(France) Charles N'Zogbia (2012–13 season)		
(England) Jed Steer	GK	N/A	13	(United States) Michael Bradley (2010–11 season)	Squad number was vacant.	
(Spain) Antonio Luna	DF	N/A	14	(Australia) Brett Holman (2012–13 season)	Squad number was vacant.	
(Australia) Chris Herd	MF	31	17	(Cameroon) Jean Makoun (2012–13 season)	Squad number was vacant.	
(England) Gary Gardner	MF	38	22	(United States) Brad Guzan (2012–13 season)		
(England) Ryan Bertrand	DF	N/A	23	(England) Nathan Delfouneso (2012–13 season)	Squad number was vacant.	
(Bulgaria) Aleksandar Tonev	MF	N/A	24	(England) Simon Dawkins (2012–13 season)	Squad number was vacant.	
(Republic of Ireland) Samir Carruthers	MF	40	25	(Scotland) Barry Bannan (2012–13 season)		
(England) Grant Holt	FW	N/A	29	(Republic of Ireland) Enda Stevens (2012–13 season)	Was given the #29 after loan move on 14 January.	
(Saint Lucia) Janoi Donacien	DF	N/A	32	(England) Nathan Baker (2012–13 season)	Was given the #32 on 1 January.	
(Republic of Ireland) Shay Given	GK	1	35	(England) Daniel Johnson (2012–13 season)		
(England) Daniel Johnson	MF	35	36	(Republic of Ireland) Graham Burke (2012–13 season)	Was given the #36 on 24 September.	
(Republic of Ireland) Enda Stevens	DF	29	37	(Republic of Ireland) Derrick Williams (2012–13 season)		
(England) Nathan Delfouneso	FW	23	38	(England) Gary Gardner (2012–13 season)		
(England) Darren Bent	FW	9	39	(Switzerland) Benjamin Siegrist (2012–13 season)		
(Republic of Ireland) Jack Grealish	MF	N/A	40	(Republic of Ireland) Samir Carruthers (2012–13 season)		

The #19 was retired for this season as a tribute to former captain Stiliyan Petrov.

== Club ==
=== Current backroom staff ===
As of 15 April 2014.

Name	Role
Paul Lambert	Manager
Gordon Cowans	Interim Co-Assistant Manager
Shay Given	Player Interim Co-Assistant Manager
Scott Marshall	First Team Coach / Defensive Coach
Terry Gennoe	Goalkeeping Coach
Michael Watts	Strength and Conditioning Coach
Chris Lorkin	Assistant Strength and Conditioning Coach
Roddy MacDonald	Head of Sport and Exercise Medicine
Alan Smith	Physiotherapist
Bryan Jones	Academy Director
Steve Burns	Assistant Academy Director
Tony McAndrew	Youth Team Manager
Simone Farina	Community Coach

Source: AVFC

=== Sponsorship ===
The club's two–year contract with Genting Casinos ended in the summer, meaning Villa would have a new main sponsor for the season. On 11 June 2013, the club announced that the new sponsor would be the Asian online betting website Dafabet and that the company's name would be featured on the new club's new kits.

Playing staff & managerial kits will again be provided by Italian sportswear manufacturer Macron.

== Senior team ==
=== Overall ===
Competition	Started round	Current position / round	Final position / round	First match	Last match
Premier League	—	—	15th	17 August 2013	11 May 2014
League Cup	2nd round	—	3rd round	28 August 2013	24 September 2013
FA Cup	3rd round	—	3rd round	4 January 2014	4 January 2014

Updated to match played 12 May 2014
Source: Competitions

=== Fixtures and results ===
==== Pre-season ====
===== Tour of Germany =====
On 17 May 2013, the club announced it would be taking part in a pre-season tour of Germany as part of the preparations for the 2013–14 season. The tour saw Villa taking on three clubs in games between 10 and 14 July 2013 with each finishing in a 1–1 draw. Nicklas Helenius scored his first two goals for the club, in the matches against SV Rödinghausen and VfL Bochum and Andreas Weimann scored against SC Paderborn.

Win Draw Loss Postponed

10 July 2013	**Rödinghausen (Germany)**	**1–1**	**Aston Villa**	Rödinghausen, Germany
19:00 UTC+1	Siek 77'	Report	Helenius 51'	Stadium: Häcker-Wiehenstadion

12 July 2013	**Paderborn (Germany)**	**1–1**	**Aston Villa**	Paderborn, Germany
18:00 UTC+1	Ten Voorde 22'	Report	Weimann 60'	Stadium: Benteler Arena; Attendance: 3,552

14 July 2013	**Bochum (Germany)**	**1–1**	**Aston Villa**	Bochum, Germany
15:30 UTC+1	Tasaka 90'	Report	Helenius 47'	Stadium: Ruhrstadion; Attendance: 7,398

===== Domestic friendlies =====
20 July 2013	**Wycombe Wanderers**	**2–2**	**Aston Villa**	High Wycombe
15:00 UTC±0	McCoy 10'; Johnson 31'	Report	Lowton 25'; Westwood 51'	Stadium: Adams Park; Attendance: 4,629

23 July 2013	**Luton Town**	**2–0**	**Aston Villa**	Luton
19:45 UTC±0	Shaw 23'; Howells 78'	Report		Stadium: Kenilworth Road; Attendance: 4,304

26 July 2013	**Crewe Alexandra**	**1–5**	**Aston Villa**	Crewe
19:30 UTC±0	Davis 39'	Report	Weimann 2'; Benteke 11', 28', 34'; Bacuna 83'	Stadium: Alexandra Stadium; Attendance: 5,423

31 July 2013	**Walsall**	**0–5**	**Aston Villa**	Walsall
19:30 UTC±0		Report	Delph 9'; Agbonlahor 33'; Benteke 52'; Grealish 67'; Gardner 86'	Stadium: Bescot Stadium; Attendance: 7,720

4 August 2013	**Shamrock Rovers (Republic of Ireland)**	**0–2**	**Aston Villa**	Dublin
14:00 UTC+0		Report	Weimann 15'; Benteke 30'	Stadium: Tallaght Stadium

10 August 2013	**Aston Villa**	**3–2**	**(Spain) Málaga**	Birmingham
15:00 UTC+0	Benteke 12', 30' (pen.); Vlaar 20'	Report	Okore 42' (o.g.); Darder 62'	Stadium: Villa Park; Attendance: 22,150

==== Premier League ====
===== League table =====
Pos	Team	Pld	W	D	L	GF	GA	GD	Pts	Qualification or relegation
13	West Ham United	38	11	7	20	40	51	−11	**40**	
14	Sunderland	38	10	8	20	41	60	−19	**38**	
**15**	Aston Villa	**38**	**10**	**8**	**20**	**39**	**61**	**−22**	**38**	
16	Hull City	38	10	7	21	38	53	−15	**37**	Qualification for the Europa League third qualifying round (Note: Hull City qualified for the Europa League third qualifying round as runners-up of the 2013–14 FA Cup since winners Arsenal qualified for Champions League.)
17	West Bromwich Albion	38	7	15	16	43	59	−16	**36**	

Source: Barclays Premier League
Rules for classification: 1) Points; 2) Goal difference; 3) Goals scored; 4) Play-offs (only if needed to decide champion, teams for relegation or teams for UEFA competitions).

===== Results by matchday =====
Matchday	1	2	3	4	5	6	7	8	9	10	11	12	13	14	15	16	17	18	19	20	21	22	23	24	25	26	27	28	29	30	31	32	33	34	35	36	37	38
Ground	A	A	H	H	A	H	A	H	H	A	H	A	H	A	A	H	A	H	H	A	H	A	H	A	H	A	A	H	A	H	H	A	H	A	H	A	H	A
Result	W	L	L	L	W	W	D	L	L	D	W	D	D	W	L	L	L	L	D	W	L	D	W	L	L	D	L	W	W	L	L	L	L	D	L	W	L	L
Position	2	5	8	16	12	9	10	13	13	13	10	12	10	10	10	11	13	13	13	11	11	10	10	10	12	11	13	11	10	11	12	13	14	15	16	14	15	15

Updated to match(es) played on 3 May 2014. Source: Statto.com
A = Away; H = Home; W = Win; D = Draw; L = Loss
Notes: Position is that of Villa at the end of their matchday, not entire round of matches.

===== Matches =====
Win Draw Loss Postponed

====== August ======
17 August 2013 1	**Arsenal**	**1–3**	**Aston Villa**	London
15:00 BST	Giroud 6'; Szczęsny (yellow card) 21'; Wilshere (yellow card) 30'; Koscielny (yellow card) 61' (yellow-red card) 67'; Cazorla (yellow card) 79'	AVFC; BBC	Benteke 22', 61' (pen.), (yellow card) 60'; Vlaar (yellow card) 30'; Luna (yellow card) 45+4', (goal) 85'; Westwood (yellow card) 65'; Agbonlahor (yellow card) 90+5'	Stadium: Emirates Stadium; Attendance: 60,003; Referee: Anthony Taylor

21 August 2013 2	**Chelsea**	**2–1**	**Aston Villa**	London
19:45 GMT	Luna 6' (o.g.); Ivanović (yellow card) 71', (goal) 73'	AVFC; BBC	Benteke 45+3', (yellow card) 76'; El Ahmadi (yellow card) 65'; Westwood (yellow card) 73'; Guzan (yellow card) 90+2'	Stadium: Stamford Bridge; Attendance: 41,527; Referee: Kevin Friend
Note: Game re-arranged due to Chelsea's participation in the 2013 UEFA Super Cup.

24 August 2013 3	**Aston Villa**	**0–1**	**Liverpool**	Birmingham
17:30 BST	Luna (yellow card) 22'; Delph (yellow card) 40'; Lowton (yellow card) 61'	AVFC; BBC	Sturridge 21'; Aspas (yellow card) 28'; Johnson (yellow card) 45+2'; Lucas (yellow card) 89'	Stadium: Villa Park; Attendance: 42,098; Referee: Mark Clattenburg

====== September ======
14 September 2013 4	**Aston Villa**	**1–2**	**Newcastle United**	Birmingham
15:00 GMT	Delph (yellow card) 33'; Benteke 67'	AVFC; BBC	Ben Arfa 18'; Yanga-Mbiwa (yellow card) 40'; Cabaye (yellow card) 57'; Debuchy (yellow card) 70'; Gouffran 73', (yellow card) 90+1'	Stadium: Villa Park; Attendance: 37,554; Referee: Mike Dean

21 September 2013 5	**Norwich City**	**0–1**	**Aston Villa**	Norwich
12:45 GMT	Snodgrass (penalty missed) 6'; Turner (yellow card) 83'	AVFC; BBC	Kozák 30'	Stadium: Carrow Road; Attendance: 26,813; Referee: Chris Foy

28 September 2013 6	**Aston Villa**	**3–2**	**Manchester City**	Birmingham
15:00 GMT	El Ahmadi 51'; Sylla (yellow card) 60'; Bacuna 73'; Weimann 75'	AVFC; BBC	Touré 45'; Nasri (yellow card) 54'; Džeko 56'	Stadium: Villa Park; Attendance: 34,063; Referee: Mike Jones

====== October ======
5 October 2013 7	**Hull City**	**0–0**	**Aston Villa**	Kingston upon Hull
15:00 GMT	Rosenior (yellow card) 34'; Davies (yellow card) 44'	AVFC; BBC	Westwood (yellow card) 35'	Stadium: KC Stadium; Attendance: 24,396; Referee: Mark Clattenburg

20 October 2013 8	**Aston Villa**	**0–2**	**Tottenham Hotspur**	Birmingham
16:00 GMT	Westwood (yellow card) 10'; Agbonlahor (yellow card) 58'; Delph (yellow card) 90+3'	AVFC; BBC	Townsend 31'; Paulinho (yellow card) 38'; Dawson (yellow card) 52'; Soldado 69'; Walker (yellow card) 89'; Lennon (yellow card) 90+3'	Stadium: Villa Park; Attendance: 35,391; Referee: Phil Dowd

26 October 2013 9	**Aston Villa**	**0–2**	**Everton**	Birmingham
15:00 GMT	Benteke (penalty missed) 8'	AVFC; BBC	McCarthy (yellow card) 62'; Lukaku 68'; Osman 81'; Howard (yellow card) 87'	Stadium: Villa Park; Attendance: 35,154; Referee: Anthony Taylor

====== November ======
2 November 2013 10	**West Ham United**	**0–0**	**Aston Villa**	London
15:00 GMT		AVFC; BBC	Bacuna (yellow card) 46'; Lowton (yellow card) 57'	Stadium: Boleyn Ground; Attendance: 34,977; Referee: Howard Webb

9 November 2013 11	**Aston Villa**	**2–0**	**Cardiff City**	Birmingham
15:00 GMT	Bacuna 76'; Kozák 86'; Clark (yellow card) 90+5'	AVFC; BBC	Medel (yellow card) 75'	Stadium: Villa Park; Attendance: 35,809; Referee: Martin Atkinson

25 November 2013 12	**West Bromwich Albion**	**2–2**	**Aston Villa**	West Bromwich
20:00 GMT	Long 3', 11'; Mulumbu (yellow card) 53'	AVFC; BBC	El Ahmadi 67'; Westwood 76'; Clark (yellow card) 86'; Agbonlahor (yellow card) 90+3'	Stadium: The Hawthorns; Attendance: 24,902; Referee: Michael Oliver

30 November 2013 13	**Aston Villa**	**0–0**	**Sunderland**	Birmingham
15:00 GMT	Vlaar (yellow card) 32'; Agbonlahor (yellow card) 90+3'	AVFC; BBC	Bardsley (yellow card) 90+4'	Stadium: Villa Park; Attendance: 33,036; Referee: Neil Swarbrick

====== December ======
4 December 2013 14	**Southampton**	**2–3**	**Aston Villa**	Southampton
19:45 GMT	Rodriguez 48'; Osvaldo 69', (yellow card) 90+7'; Fonte (yellow card) 82'; Lambert (yellow card) 90+7'	AVFC; BBC	Agbonlahor 15'; Kozák 64', (yellow card) 65'; Delph 80'; Weimann (yellow card) 90+6'	Stadium: St Mary's Stadium; Attendance: 29,814; Referee: Jonathan Moss

8 December 2013 15	**Fulham**	**2–0**	**Aston Villa**	London
13:30 GMT	Sidwell 21'; Berbatov 30' (pen.)	AVFC; BBC	Delph (yellow card) 19'; Herd (yellow card) 67'	Stadium: Craven Cottage; Attendance: 22,288; Referee: Mike Dean

15 December 2013 16	**Aston Villa**	**0–3**	**Manchester United**	Birmingham
13:30 GMT	Agbonlahor (yellow card) 50'; Lowton (yellow card) 65'; Clark (yellow card) 73'; Baker (yellow card) 78'	AVFC; BBC	Welbeck 15', 18', (yellow card) 78'; De Gea (yellow card) 50'; Cleverley 52'	Stadium: Villa Park; Attendance: 42,682; Referee: Lee Mason

21 December 2013 17	**Stoke City**	**2–1**	**Aston Villa**	Stoke-on-Trent
15:00 GMT	Wilson (yellow card) 26'; Adam 51'; Crouch 70'	AVFC; BBC	Albrighton (yellow card) 21'; Clark (yellow card) 50'; Delph (yellow card) 60'; Herd (yellow card) 61'; Kozák 66'; Westwood (yellow card) 85'	Stadium: Britannia Stadium; Attendance: 26,003; Referee: Craig Pawson

26 December 2013 18	**Aston Villa**	**0–1**	**Crystal Palace**	Birmingham
15:00 GMT	Baker (yellow card) 35'; El Ahmadi (yellow card) 72'	AVFC; BBC	Bannan (yellow card) 37'; Jerome (yellow card) 67'; Gayle 90+2'	Stadium: Villa Park; Attendance: 37,752; Referee: Howard Webb

28 December 2013 19	**Aston Villa**	**1–1**	**Swansea City**	Birmingham
15:00 GMT	Agbonlahor 7'; Bacuna (yellow card) 69'; Clark (yellow card) 86'; El Ahmadi (yellow card) 90'	AVFC; BBC	Lamah 36', (yellow card) 37'; Rangel (yellow card) 77'	Stadium: Villa Park; Attendance: 37,028; Referee: Roger East

====== January ======
1 January 2014 20	**Sunderland**	**0–1**	**Aston Villa**	Sunderland
15:00 GMT	Giaccherini (yellow card) 23'; Ki (yellow card) 64'; Colback (yellow card) 90+1'; Altidore (yellow card) 90+1'	AVFC; BBC	Agbonlahor 15', (yellow card) 90+1'; Bacuna (yellow card) 41'; Delph (yellow card) 57'	Stadium: Stadium of Light; Attendance: 39,757; Referee: Mike Jones

13 January 2014 21	**Aston Villa**	**1–2**	**Arsenal**	Birmingham
20:00 GMT	El Ahmadi (yellow card) 2'; Benteke 76'; Agbonlahor (yellow card) 85'	AVFC; BBC	Monreal (yellow card) 32'; Wilshere 34', (yellow card) 90+5'; Giroud 35'	Stadium: Villa Park; Attendance: 36,097; Referee: Neil Swarbrick

18 January 2014 22	**Liverpool**	**2–2**	**Aston Villa**	Liverpool
17:30 GMT	Sturridge 45+2'; Gerrard 53' (pen.); Sterling (yellow card) 90+3'	AVFC; BBC	Clark (yellow card) 16'; Ahmadi (yellow card) 21'; Weimann 25'; Benteke 36'; Bertrand (yellow card) 48'; Bacuna (yellow card) 88'	Stadium: Anfield; Attendance: 44,737; Referee: Jonathan Moss
Note: Raheem Sterling is credited with a yellow card on the BBC website but the minute it was shown is not given.

29 January 2014 23	**Aston Villa**	**4–3**	**West Bromwich Albion**	Birmingham
19:45 GMT	Weimann 12'; Bacuna 24'; Delph 37'; Benteke 64' (pen.); Holt (yellow card) 89'	AVFC; BBC	Brunt 4', (yellow card) 70'; Delph 9' (o.g.); Mulumbu 43'; Lugano (yellow card) 68'; Olsson (yellow card) 87'	Stadium: Villa Park; Attendance: 36,083; Referee: Mark Clattenburg

====== February ======
1 February 2014 24	**Everton**	**2–1**	**Aston Villa**	Liverpool
15:00 GMT	Naismith 74'; Mirallas 85'; Baines (yellow card) 86'	AVFC; BBC	Bacuna 34'	Stadium: Goodison Park; Attendance: 39,469; Referee: Robert Madley

8 February 2014 25	**Aston Villa**	**0–2**	**West Ham United**	Birmingham
15:00 GMT		AVFC; BBC	Collins (yellow card) 40'; Nolan 46', 48'; Taylor (yellow card) 65'	Stadium: Villa Park; Attendance: 36,261; Referee: Mike Dean

11 February 2014 26	**Cardiff City**	**0–0**	**Aston Villa**	Cardiff
19:45 GMT		AVFC; BBC		Stadium: Cardiff City Stadium; Attendance: 27,597; Referee: Chris Foy

23 February 2014 27	**Newcastle United**	**1–0**	**Aston Villa**	Newcastle upon Tyne
13:30 GMT	Tioté (yellow card) 69'; Rémy 90+2', (yellow card) 90+3'	AVFC; BBC	Vlaar (yellow card) 43'; El Ahmadi (yellow card) 69'	Stadium: St James' Park; Attendance: 50,417; Referee: Martin Atkinson

====== March ======
1 March 2014 28	**Aston Villa**	**4–1**	**Norwich City**	Birmingham
16:30 GMT	Benteke 25', 27'; Bacuna 37'; Bassong 41' (o.g.)	AVFC; BBC	Hoolahan 3'; Tettey (yellow card) 30'; Snodgrass (yellow card) 45+2'; Elmander (yellow card) 88'	Stadium: Villa Park; Attendance: 30,303; Referee: Anthony Taylor

8 March 2014	**Manchester City**	**P – P**	**Aston Villa**	Manchester
15:00 GMT				Stadium: City of Manchester Stadium
Note: Postponed due to Manchester City's involvement in the FA Cup. Rescheduled for 7 May 2014.

15 March 2014 30	**Aston Villa**	**1–0**	**Chelsea**	Birmingham
17:30 GMT	Baker (yellow card) 5'; Bennett (yellow card) 45'; Benteke (yellow card) 67'; Vlaar (yellow card) 77'; Delph 82'	AVFC; BBC	Willian (yellow card) 25' (yellow-red card) 68'; Ramires (yellow card) 90' (red card) 90+4'	Stadium: Villa Park; Attendance: 40,084; Referee: Chris Foy
Note: Ramires had received a yellow card in the 90th minute before being shown a straight red card in stoppage time.

23 March 2014 31	**Aston Villa**	**1–4**	**Stoke City**	Birmingham
16:00 GMT	Benteke 5', (yellow card) 52'; El Ahmadi (yellow card) 8'; Albrighton (yellow card) 72'; Bacuna (yellow card) 81'; Baker (yellow card) 83'	AVFC; BBC	Odemwingie 22'; Palacios (yellow card) 24'; Crouch 26'; Nzonzi 42'; Cameron 90'	Stadium: Villa Park; Attendance: 30,292; Referee: Mark Clattenburg

29 March 2014 32	**Manchester United**	**4–1**	**Aston Villa**	Greater Manchester
12:45 BST	Rafael (yellow card) 12'; Büttner (yellow card) 16'; Rooney 20', 45' (pen.); Mata 57'; Hernández 90+1'	AVFC; BBC	Westwood 13'; Bacuna (yellow card) 45'; Bertrand (yellow card) 64'; Clark (yellow card) 88'; Lowton (yellow card) 90+3'	Stadium: Old Trafford; Attendance: 75,368; Referee: Martin Atkinson

====== April ======
5 April 2014 33	**Aston Villa**	**1–2**	**Fulham**	Birmingham
15:00 BST	Bennett (yellow card) 59'; Westwood (yellow card) 67'; Holt 70'; Albrighton (yellow card) 90'	AVFC; BBC	Richardson 61'; Sidwell (yellow card) 84'; Rodallega 86'; Holtby (yellow card) 87'	Stadium: Villa Park; Attendance: 33,532; Referee: Michael Oliver

12 April 2014 34	**Crystal Palace**	**1–0**	**Aston Villa**	London
15:00 BST	Puncheon 76'	AVFC; BBC	Baker (yellow card) 62'; Bertrand (yellow card) 70'	Stadium: Selhurst Park; Attendance: 25,564; Referee: Howard Webb

19 April 2014 35	**Aston Villa**	**0–0**	**Southampton**	Birmingham
15:00 BST		AVFC; BBC	Lovren (yellow card) 61'; Shaw (yellow card) 66'	Stadium: Villa Park; Attendance: 35,134; Referee: Lee Mason

26 April 2014 36	**Swansea City**	**4–1**	**Aston Villa**	Swansea
15:00 BST	Bony 10', 90+4' (pen.); Shelvey 26'; Hernández 73'; Amat (yellow card) 77'	AVFC; BBC	Agbonlahor 22'; Albrighton (yellow card) 89'; Baker (yellow card) 90+1'; Westwood (yellow card) 90+2'	Stadium: Liberty Stadium; Attendance: 20,701; Referee: Mark Clattenburg

====== May ======
3 May 2014 37	**Aston Villa**	**3–1**	**Hull City**	Birmingham
15:00 GMT	Westwood 1'; Weimann 41', 45+3'	AVFC; BBC	Bowery 28' (o.g.)	Stadium: Villa Park; Attendance: 37,182; Referee: Mike Dean

7 May 2014 29	**Manchester City**	**4–0**	**Aston Villa**	Manchester
19:45 GMT	Džeko 64', 72'; Jovetić 89', (yellow card) 90'; Touré 90+3'	AVFC; BBC	Delph (yellow card) 56'; Clark (yellow card) 74'	Stadium: City of Manchester Stadium; Attendance: 47,023; Referee: Michael Oliver
Note: Rescheduled from 8 March.

11 May 2014 38	**Tottenham Hotspur**	**3–0**	**Aston Villa**	London
15:00 BST	Paulinho 14'; Baker 35' (o.g.); Adebayor 38' (pen.); Naughton (yellow card) 73'	AVFC; BBC		Stadium: White Hart Lane; Attendance: 35,826; Referee: Jonathan Moss

==== FA Cup ====
Round	3
Ground	H
Result	1–2

4 January 2014 Third round	**Aston Villa**	**1–2**	**Sheffield United**	Birmingham
15:00 GMT	Clark (yellow card) 34'; Helenius 75'; Westwood (yellow card) 84'; Delph (yellow card) 89'	AVFC; BBC	Collins (yellow card) 12'; Murphy 20'; Flynn 81'; Long (yellow card) 90+2'	Stadium: Villa Park; Attendance: 24,038; Referee: David Coote

==== League Cup ====
Round	2	3
Ground	H	H
Result	3–0	0–4

28 August 2013 Second round	**Aston Villa**	**3–0**	**Rotherham United**	Birmingham
19:45 UTC±0	Weimann 19'; Delph (yellow card) 35', (goal) 53'; Benteke 40'	AVFC; BBC		Stadium: Villa Park; Attendance: 22,447; Referee: Simon Hooper

24 September 2013 Third round	**Aston Villa**	**0–4**	**Tottenham Hotspur**	Birmingham
19:45 UTC±0		AVFC; BBC	Defoe 45+1', 90+2'; Paulinho 49'; Chadli 86'	Stadium: Villa Park; Attendance: 22,975; Referee: Jonathan Moss

=== Statistics ===
==== League results summary ====
Overall								Home						Away					
Pld	W	D	L	GF	GA	GD	Pts	W	D	L	GF	GA	GD	W	D	L	GF	GA	GD
38	10	8	20	39	61	−22	38	6	3	10	22	29	−7	4	5	10	17	32	−15

Last updated: 12 May 2014.
Source: Competitive matches

==== Overall ====
Games played	**41** (38 Premier League, 1 FA Cup, 2 League Cup)
Games won	**11** (10 Premier League, 1 League Cup)
Games drawn	**8** (8 Premier League)
Games lost	**22** (20 Premier League, 1 FA Cup, 1 League Cup)
Goals scored	**43** (39 Premier League, 1 FA Cup, 3 League Cup)
Goals conceded	**67** (61 Premier League, 2 FA Cup, 4 League Cup)
Total goal difference	**–24** (−22 Premier League, −1 FA Cup, −1 League Cup)
Clean sheets	**10** (9 Premier League, 1 League Cup)
Yellow Cards	**82** (78 Premier League, 3 FA Cup, 1 League Cup)
Red Cards	**0**
Most appearances	(Austria) **Weimann** (39)
Most minutes played	(United States) **Guzan** (3420)
Top scorer	(Belgium) **Benteke** (11)
Worst Discipline	(Republic of Ireland) **Clark** (England) **Delph** (9 (yellow card) )
Best Result (League)^{1}	**4–1** v Norwich City, (H, 2 March 2014)
Best Result (Cup)^{1}	**3–0** v Rotherham United, League Cup (H, 28 August 2013)
Worst Result (League)^{2}	**0–4** v Manchester City (A, 7 May 2014)
Worst Result (Cup)^{2}	**0–4** v Tottenham Hotspur, League Cup (H, 24 September 2013)
Points	**38**

^{1} "Best result" is defined by goal difference between the two teams. How many goals Villa score and whether they keep a clean sheet affects which result is listed (when goal difference is the same e.g. 1–0 or 2–1).
^{2} "Worst result" is defined by goal difference between the two teams. How many goals Villa concede and how many they score affects which result is listed (when goal difference is the same e.g. 0–1 or 1–2).

==== Appearances ====
**Number**	**Nation**	**Name**	**Premier League**		**FA Cup**		**League Cup**		Total		Notes
**Number**	**Nation**	**Name**	Start	Sub	Start	Sub	Start	Sub	Start	Sub	
Goalkeepers
1	(United States)	Guzan	38	–	–	–	–	–	38	0	
13	(England)	Steer	–	–	1	–	2	–	3	0	
35	(Republic of Ireland)	Given	–	–	–	–	–	–	0	0	(Note: Loaned to Middlesbrough on 28 November 2013, returned 28 February 2014.)
Defenders
2	(England)	Baker	29	1	–	–	1	–	30	1	
3	(England)	Bennett	3	2	–	–	2	–	5	2	
4	(Netherlands)	Vlaar	32	–	–	–	2	–	34	0	
5	(Denmark)	Okore	2	1	–	–	1	–	3	1	
6	(Republic of Ireland)	Clark	23	4	1	–	–	–	25	3	
14	(Spain)	Luna	16	1	1	–	–	–	17	1	
23	(England)	Bertrand	16	–	–	–	–	–	16	0	(Note: Signed on loan from Chelsea on 17 January 2013.)
32	(Saint Lucia)	Donacien	–	–	–	–	–	–	0	0	
34	(England)	Lowton	18	5	1	–	1	–	20	5	
37	(Republic of Ireland)	Stevens	–	–	–	–	–	–	0	0	(Note: Loaned to Notts County on 27 August 2013, returned 24 September.) (Note: Loaned to Doncaster Rovers on 28 November 2013.)
–	(Scotland)	Hutton	–	–	–	–	–	–	0	0	(Note: Loaned to Bolton Wanderers on 28 February 2014.)
Midfielders
7	(Curaçao)	Bacuna	28	7	1	–	2	–	31	7	
8	(Morocco)	El Ahmadi	26	5	–	–	2	–	28	5	
12	(England)	Albrighton	9	10	1	–	1	–	11	10	(Note: Loaned to Wigan Athletic on 30 October 2013, returned 27 November.)
15	(England)	Westwood	35	–	1	–	1	–	36	0	
16	(England)	Delph	33	1	1	–	1	–	34	1	
17	(Australia)	Herd	2	–	–	–	–	–	2	0	
18	(Mali)	Sylla	5	6	–	–	1	1	6	7	
22	(England)	Gardner	–	–	–	–	–	–	0	0	(Note: Loaned to Sheffield Wednesday on 12 February 2014, returned 12 March.)
24	(Bulgaria)	Tonev	6	11	1	–	1	1	9	11	
25	(Republic of Ireland)	Carruthers	–	–	–	–	–	–	0	0	(Note: Loaned to MK Dons on 10 August 2013.)
36	(England)	Johnson	–	–	–	–	–	–	0	0	
40	(Republic of Ireland)	Grealish	–	1	–	–	–	–	0	1	
–	(France)	N'Zogbia	–	–	–	–	–	–	0	0	
Forwards
9	(Denmark)	Helenius	–	3	–	1	1	1	1	5	
10	(Austria)	Weimann	31	6	1	–	1	–	33	6	
11	(England)	Agbonlahor	29	1	–	–	1	–	30	1	
20	(Belgium)	Benteke	24	2	1	–	1	–	26	2	
21	(England)	Bowery	2	7	–	–	–	1	2	8	(Note: Loaned to Doncaster Rovers on 15 February 2014, returned 15 March.)
27	(Czech Republic)	Kozák	8	6	–	–	1	–	9	6	
29	(England)	Holt	3	7	–	–	–	–	3	7	(Note: Signed on loan from Wigan Athletic on 14 January 2014.)
37	(England)	Robinson	–	4	–	–	–	1	0	4	
38	(England)	Delfouneso	–	–	–	–	–	–	0	0	(Note: Loaned to Blackpool on 16 August 2013, returned 1 January 2014.) (Note: Loaned to Coventry City on 30 January 2014.)
39	(England)	Bent	–	–	–	–	–	–	0	0	(Note: Loaned to Fulham on 16 August 2013.)

Notes

|} Last updated: 12 May 2014
Source: Squad stats and Start formations.
Only competitive matches.
Using the most used start formation.
Ordered by position on pitch (from back right to front left).
Includes Cup competitions as well (League Cup & FA Cup).

==== Captains ====
No.	P	Name	Country	No. games	Notes
4	DF	Vlaar	(Netherlands)	35	
11	FW	Agbonlahor	(England)	4	
1	GK	Guzan	(United States)	1	
6	DF	Clark	(Republic of Ireland)	1	

Last updated: 12 May 2014
Source: Competitive match reports.
Competitive matches only
Matches started as captain only
Country: FIFA nationality; No.: Squad number; P: Position; Name: Player name; No. Games: Number of games started as captain.

==== Goalscorers ====
Correct as of 11 May 2014
Players with the same number of goals are listed by their position on the club's official website Source
Players highlighted in light grey denote the player had scored for the club before leaving for another club
Players highlighted in light cyan denote the player has scored for the club after arriving at Aston Villa during the season
Players highlighted in Blonde denote the player has scored for the club before leaving the club on loan for part/the rest of the season

Pos.	Playing Pos.	Nation	Name	Premier League	FA Cup	League Cup	Total
1	FW	(Belgium)	Christian Benteke	10		1	11
2	FW	(Austria)	Andreas Weimann	5		1	6
3	MF	(Curaçao)	Leandro Bacuna	5			5
4	MF	(England)	Fabian Delph	3		1	4
4	FW	(England)	Gabriel Agbonlahor	4			4
4	FW	(Czech Republic)	Libor Kozák	4			4
7	MF	(England)	Ashley Westwood	3			3
8	MF	(Morocco)	Karim El Ahmadi	2			2
9	DF	(Spain)	Antonio Luna	1			1
9	FW	(Denmark)	Nicklas Helenius		1		1
9	FW	(England)	Grant Holt	1			1
**Own Goals**				1			1
**Total**				**39**	**1**	**3**	42

==== Disciplinary record ====
Correct as of 11 May 2014
Players are listed in descending order of (yellow card)
Players with the same number of cards are listed by their position on the club's official website Source
Players highlighted in light grey denote the player has received a yellow/red card for the club before leaving for another club
Players highlighted in light cyan denote the player has received a yellow/red card for the club after arriving at Aston Villa during the season
Players highlighted in Blonde denote the player has received a yellow/red card for the club before leaving the club on loan for part/the rest of the season

**No.**	**Nat**	**Pos**	**Name**	**Premier League**			**FA Cup**			**League Cup**			Total		
**No.**	**Nat**	**Pos**	**Name**	Yellow card	(yellow card) (yellow-red card)	Red card	Yellow card	(yellow card) (yellow-red card)	Red card	Yellow card	(yellow card) (yellow-red card)	Red card	Yellow card	(yellow card) (yellow-red card)	Red card
6	(Republic of Ireland)	DF	Ciaran Clark	8	–	–	1	–	–	–	–	–	9	0	0
16	(England)	MF	Fabian Delph	7	–	–	1	–	–	1	–	–	9	0	0
15	(England)	MF	Ashley Westwood	7	–	–	1	–	–	–	–	–	8	0	0
8	(Morocco)	MF	Karim El Ahmadi	7	–	–	–	–	–	–	–	–	7	0	0
11	(England)	FW	Gabriel Agbonlahor	7	–	–	–	–	–	–	–	–	7	0	0
2	(England)	DF	Nathan Baker	6	–	–	–	–	–	–	–	–	6	0	0
7	(Curaçao)	MF	Leandro Bacuna	6	–	–	–	–	–	–	–	–	6	0	0
4	(Netherlands)	DF	Ron Vlaar	4	–	–	–	–	–	–	–	–	4	0	0
34	(England)	DF	Matthew Lowton	4	–	–	–	–	–	–	–	–	4	0	0
12	(England)	MF	Marc Albrighton	4	–	–	–	–	–	–	–	–	4	0	0
20	(Belgium)	FW	Christian Benteke	4	–	–	–	–	–	–	–	–	4	0	0
23	(England)	DF	Ryan Bertrand	3	–	–	–	–	–	–	–	–	3	0	0
3	(England)	DF	Joe Bennett	2	–	–	–	–	–	–	–	–	2	0	0
14	(Spain)	DF	Antonio Luna	2	–	–	–	–	–	–	–	–	2	0	0
17	(Australia)	MF	Chris Herd	2	–	–	–	–	–	–	–	–	2	0	0
1	(United States)	GK	Brad Guzan	1	–	–	–	–	–	–	–	–	1	0	0
18	(Mali)	MF	Yacouba Sylla	1	–	–	–	–	–	–	–	–	1	0	0
10	(Austria)	FW	Andreas Weimann	1	–	–	–	–	–	–	–	–	1	0	0
27	(Czech Republic)	FW	Libor Kozák	1	–	–	–	–	–	–	–	–	1	0	0
29	(England)	FW	Grant Holt	1	–	–	–	–	–	–	–	–	1	0	0
			**TOTALS**	**78**	–	–	**3**	–	–	**1**	–	–	82	0	0

==== Suspensions ====
Player	Date Received	Offence	Length of suspension	
(England) Fabian Delph	(yellow card) v Fulham, 8 December	5 cautions	**1 Match**	Manchester United (H), Premier League
(England) Gabriel Agbonlahor	(yellow card) v Manchester United, 15 December	5 cautions	**1 Match**	Stoke City (A), Premier League
(England) Ashley Westwood	(yellow card) v Stoke City, 21 December	5 cautions	**1 Match**	Crystal Palace (H), Premier League
(Republic of Ireland) Ciaran Clark	(yellow card) v Swansea City, 28 December	5 cautions	**1 Match**	Sunderland (A), Premier League

==== Clean sheets ====
Includes all competitive matches.

R	No.	Pos	Nat	Name	Premier League	FA Cup	League Cup	Total
1	1	GK	(United States)	**Brad Guzan**	9	–	–	**9**
2	13	GK	(England)	**Jed Steer**	–	0	1	**1**
				**TOTALS**	**9**	**0**	**1**	**10**

As of

==== Penalties awarded ====
Includes all competitive matches.

R	No.	Pos	Nat	Name	Competition	Opposition	Success	Notes
1	20	FW	(Belgium)	Christian Benteke	Premier League	vs. Arsenal (17 August 2013)	✗	Initially saved by Szczesny but rebound was scored.
2	20	FW	(Belgium)	Christian Benteke	Premier League	vs. Arsenal (17 August 2013)	✓	
3	20	FW	(Belgium)	Christian Benteke	Premier League	vs. Everton (26 October 2013)	✗	Saved by Howard.
4	20	FW	(Belgium)	Christian Benteke	Premier League	vs. WBA (29 January 2014)	✓	

As of

==== Injuries ====
Players in bold are still out from their injuries.
Players listed will/have miss(ed) at least one competitive game (missing from whole match day squad).

Date	No.	Pos.	Name	Injury	Note	Recovery time	Source
21 June 2013	10	MF	Charles N'Zogbia	Ruptured Achilles tendon	Occurred during pre-season training.	10 months	
31 July 2013	17	MF	Chris Herd	Calf problem	Occurred during pre-season match against Walsall.	3 weeks	
4–9 August 2013	22	MF	Gary Gardner	Back injury	Occurred during pre-season. Exact date of injury unknown, occurred between dates shown.	14 weeks	
12 August 2013	18	MF	Yacouba Sylla	Twisted ankle	Occurred during under–21 match against West Ham United.	1 week	
17 August 2013	2	DF	Nathan Baker	Twisted ankle	Occurred during match against Arsenal.	3 weeks	
27 August 2013	14	DF	Antonio Luna	Unspecified injury	Missed the match against Rotherham on 27 August 2014.	Exact time unknown	
16 September 2013	5	DF	Jores Okore	Ruptured ACL	Occurred during match against Newcastle United.	6–9 months	
16–23 September 2013	17	MF	Chris Herd	Unspecified injury	Exact date of injury unknown, occurred between dates shown.	3 weeks	
16–23 September 2013	15	MF	Ashley Westwood	Thigh strain	Occurred during training. Exact date of injury unknown, occurred between dates shown.	3 weeks	
16–23 September 2013	11	FW	Gabriel Agbonlahor	Ankle injury	Prior injury, aggravated during match against Norwich City. Exact date of injury unknown, occurred between dates shown.	2 weeks	
16–23 September 2013	16	MF	Fabian Delph	Unspecified injury	Prior injury, aggravated during match against Norwich City. Exact date of injury unknown, occurred between dates shown.	1 week	
16–23 September 2013	14	DF	Antonio Luna	Unspecified injury	Prior injury, aggravated during match against Norwich City. Exact date of injury unknown, occurred between dates shown.	1 week	
21 September 2013	20	FW	Christian Benteke	Hip flexor injury	Occurred during match against Norwich City.	1 month	
13–20 October 2013	6	DF	Ciaran Clark	Sickness bug	Exact date of injury unknown, occurred between dates shown.	1 week	
24 October 2013	12	MF	Marc Albrighton	Throat injury	Underwent a 'minor throat operation' according to club website.	Exact time unknown	
26 October 2013	14	DF	Antonio Luna	Hamstring injury	Occurred during match against Everton.	1 month	
26–31 October 2013	27	DF	Joe Bennett	Back injury	Exact date of injury unknown, occurred between dates shown.	10 weeks	
26–31 October 2013	11	FW	Gabriel Agbonlahor	Ankle injury	Prior injury from September, didn't fully recover. Exact date of injury unknown, occurred between dates shown.	3 weeks	
31 October 2013	16	MF	Fabian Delph	Sickness bug / knee injury		3 weeks	
2 November 2013	10	FW	Andreas Weimann	Hamstring injury	Occurred during game against West Ham United.	3 weeks	
4 December 2013	4	DF	Ron Vlaar	Calf problem	Occurred during game against Southampton.	1 month	
4 December 2013	14	DF	Antonio Luna	Groin injury	Occurred during game against Southampton.	9 days	
4 December 2013	27	FW	Libor Kozák	Toe injury	Occurred during game against Southampton.	9 days	
8 December 2013	17	DF	Chris Herd	Facial injury	Occurred during game against Fulham.	1 week	
15–21 December 2013	20	FW	Christian Benteke	Knee problem	Exact date of injury unknown, occurred between dates shown.	2 weeks	
26–28 December 2013	17	MF	Chris Herd	Hamstring problem	Occurrence unknown.	2 months	
2 January 2014	27	FW	Libor Kozák	Broken leg	Occurred during training.	6–8 months	
4 January 2014	2	DF	Nathan Baker	Unspecified injury	Occurred during warm-up before Sheffield United game.	1 week	
13 January 2014	2	DF	Nathan Baker	Mild concussion	Occurred during game against Arsenal.	2 weeks	
19 January 2014	11	FW	Gabriel Agbonlahor	Foot injury	Occurred during game against Liverpool.	2 weeks	
1 February 2014	4	DF	Ron Vlaar	Hamstring injury	Occurred during game against Everton.	10 days	
22 March 2014	8	MF	Karim El Ahmadi	Thigh strain	Occurred during game against Stoke City.	3 weeks	
23–29 March 2014	2	DF	Nathan Baker	Foot injury	Unknown how injury occurred.	1 week	
30 March−3 April 2014	22	MF	Gary Gardner	Foot injury	Unknown how injury occurred.	Currently unknown	
3 April 2014	20	FW	Christian Benteke	Ruptured Achilles tendon	Occurred in training.	6 months	
3 April 2014	11	FW	Gabriel Agbonlahor	Sickness bug		1 week	
5 April 2014	16	MF	Fabian Delph	Leg injury		1 week	
Exact date unknown	9	FW	Nicklas Helenius	Abductor strain	Injury according to Birmingham Mail article.	Exact time unknown	
12 April 2014	7	MF	Leandro Bacuna	Hamstring strain		1 week	
21–24 April 2014	3	DF	Joe Bennett	Ankle injury		Exact time unknown	
3 May 2014	11	FW	Gabriel Agbonlahor	Knee injury	Occurred during match against Hull City.	1 week	
3 May 2014	12	MF	Marc Albrighton	Groin injury	Occurred during match against Hull City.	Exact time unknown	

==== Home attendances ====
Correct as 3 May 2014
Win Draw Loss

Comp	Week/Round	Date	Score	Opponent	Attendance
Premier League	3	24 August 2013	0–1	Liverpool	42,098
League Cup	2	28 August 2013	3–0	Rotherham United	22,447
Premier League	4	14 September 2013	1–2	Newcastle United	37,554
League Cup	3	24 September 2013	0–4	Tottenham Hotspur	22,975
Premier League	6	28 September 2013	3–2	Manchester City	34,063
Premier League	8	20 October 2013	0–2	Tottenham Hotspur	35,591
Premier League	9	26 October 2013	0–2	Everton	35,154
Premier League	11	9 November 2013	2–0	Cardiff City	35,809
Premier League	13	30 November 2013	0–0	Sunderland	33,036
Premier League	16	15 December 2013	0–3	Manchester United	42,682
Premier League	18	26 December 2013	0–1	Crystal Palace	37,752
Premier League	19	28 December 2013	1–1	Swansea City	37,028
FA Cup	3	4 January 2014	1–2	Sheffield United	24,038
Premier League	21	14 January 2014	1–2	Arsenal	36,097
Premier League	23	29 January 2014	4–3	West Bromwich Albion	36,083
Premier League	25	8 February 2014	0–2	West Ham United	36,261
Premier League	28	2 March 2014	4–1	Norwich City	30,303
Premier League	29	15 March 2014	1–0	Chelsea	40,084
Premier League	30	23 March 2014	1–4	Stoke City	30,292
Premier League	32	5 April 2014	1–2	Fulham	33,532
Premier League	34	19 April 2014	0–0	Southampton	35,134
Premier League	36	3 May 2014	3–1	Hull City	37,182
				**Total Attendance**	**719,458**
				**Average League Attendance**	**36,080**
				**Average Attendance**	**32,701**
