= Aleksandar Tonev =

Bulgarian footballer

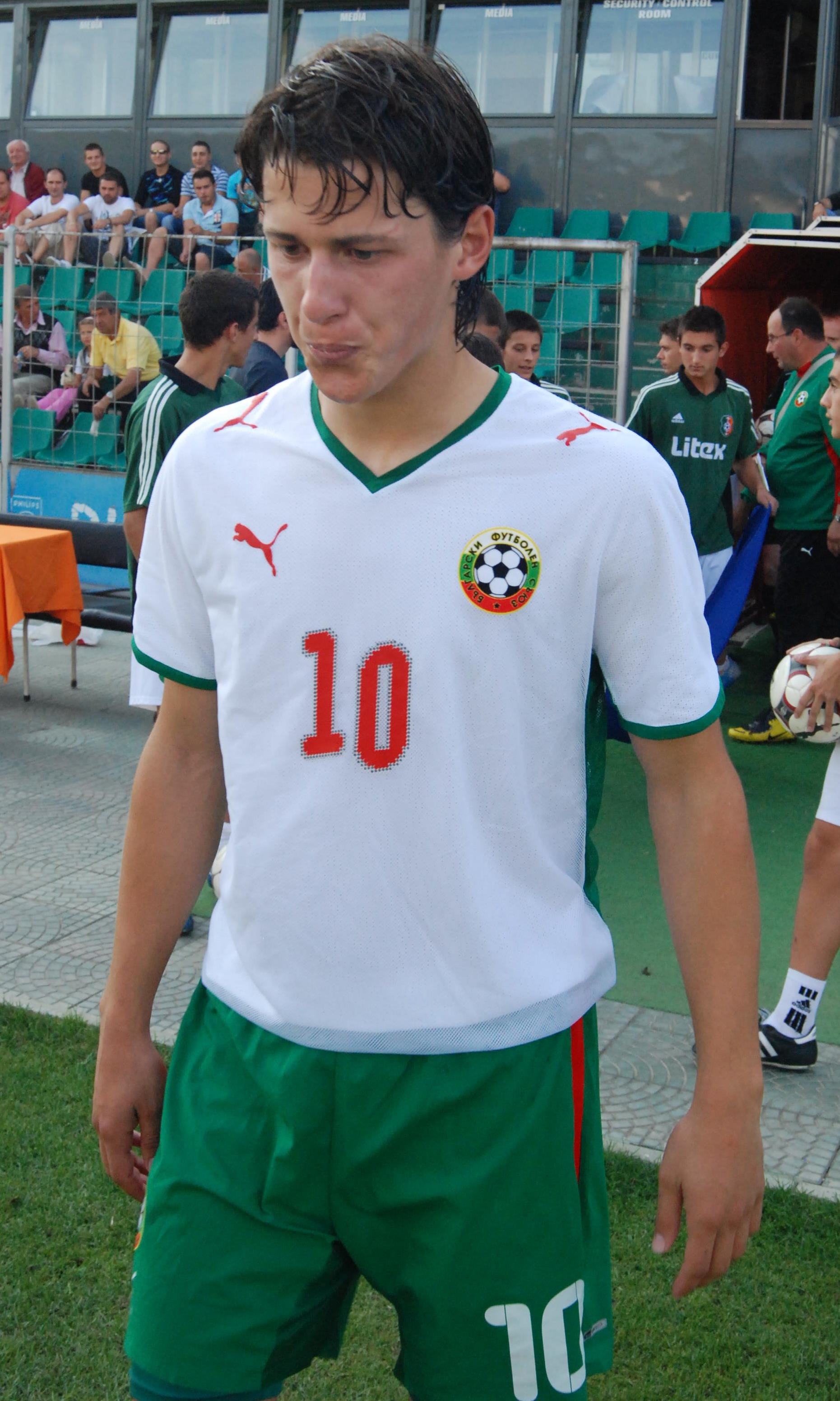
- Tonev playing for Bulgaria U21 in 2010

Personal information
- Full name: Aleksandar Antonov Tonev
- Date of birth: 3 February 1990 (age 36)
- Place of birth: Elin Pelin, Bulgaria
- Height: 1.78 m (5 ft 10 in)
- Position: Winger

Youth career
- Levski Elin Pelin
- 2002–2008: CSKA Sofia

Senior career*
Years	Team	Apps	(Gls)
2008–2011	CSKA Sofia	42	(4)
2009–2010	→ Sliven (loan)	23	(1)
2011–2013	Lech Poznań	54	(6)
2013–2015	Aston Villa	17	(0)
2014–2015	→ Celtic (loan)	6	(0)
2015–2016	Frosinone	22	(0)
2016–2018	Crotone	21	(1)
2018–2020	Botev Plovdiv	32	(2)
Total		217	(14)

International career
2007–2008	Bulgaria U19	5	(0)
2008–2012	Bulgaria U21	14	(4)
2011–2020	Bulgaria	29	(5)
- * Club domestic league appearances and goals

Aleksandar Antonov Tonev (Bulgarian: Александър Антонов Тонев; born 3 February 1990) is a Bulgarian former professional footballer who played as a winger.

He began his career at CSKA Sofia, also spending a season on loan at Sliven 2000 before joining the Polish Ekstraklasa club Lech Poznań in 2011. In his second season, he inspired them to runners-up position in the league, and was signed by Aston Villa. In 2014, Villa loaned him to Celtic, and then sold him to Frosinone the following year. He spent one year there before transferring to fellow Serie A team Crotone.

A full international since 2011, Tonev has earned over 30 caps for the different national sides of Bulgaria.

== Club career ==
=== CSKA Sofia ===
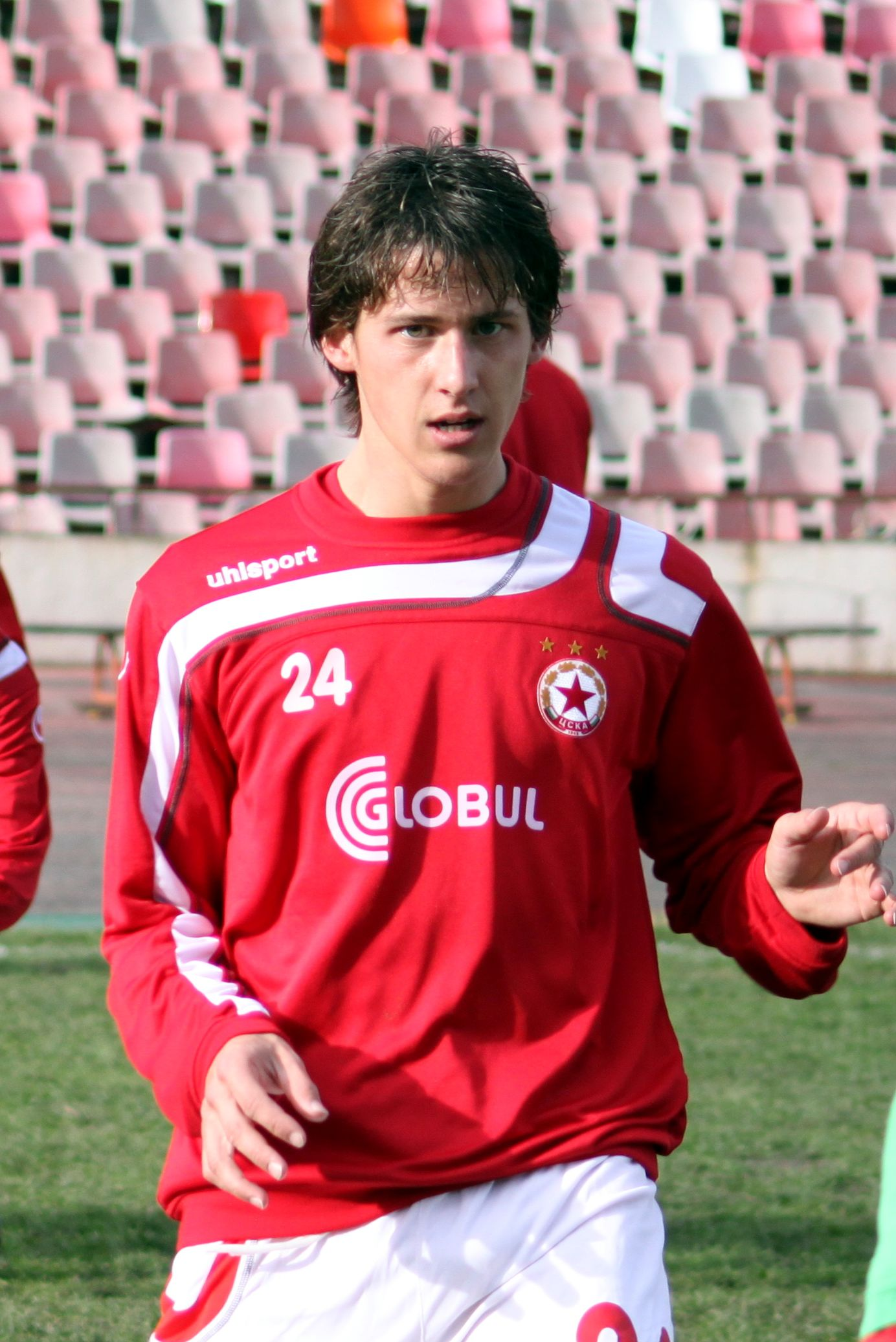
Tonev playing for CSKA Sofia in November 2010

Born in Elin Pelin, Sofia Province, Tonev was raised in CSKA Sofia's youth teams. He made his first team debut in a 3–1 league win over Belasitsa Petrich on 8 March 2008, coming on as a substitute for Chigozie Udoji. Tonev got his chance in CSKA's first team after the sale of many players in the summer of 2008. He played in the club's first fixture in the 2008–09 season against Litex Lovech on 3 August 2008. His team won the game and won the Bulgarian Supercup for the third time.

After Lyuboslav Penev replaced Dimitar Penev as head coach of CSKA Sofia, Tonev appeared in the match groups more often and often came in as a substitute for his team. On 22 April 2009, Tonev scored his first 2 goals for CSKA, securing a brace in the 4–1 away win against Vihren Sandanski.

He was loaned to OFC Sliven 2000 for the 2009–10 season, where he was likely to receive more chances to play. He was recalled from his loan to the team from Sliven for the 2010–11 season.

=== Lech Poznań ===
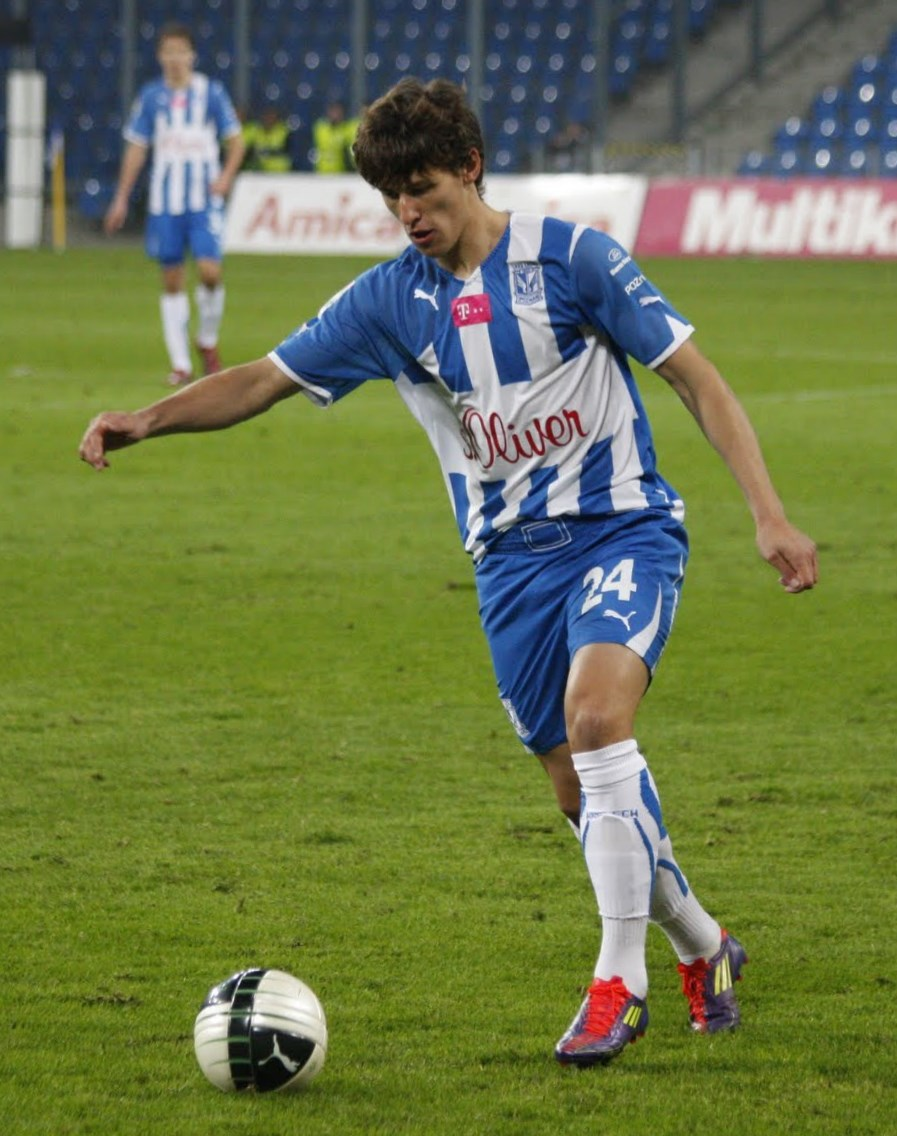
Tonev playing for Lech Poznań in October 2011

On 16 June 2011 Tonev signed with Polish Ekstraklasa club Lech Poznań. He made his debut on 29 July 2011, coming on in 75th minute, replacing Jakub Wilk in a game against ŁKS Łódź. Lech Poznań won the game 5–0.

On 26 July 2012, Tonev scored his first ever European goal, netting the only goal in a 1–0 home victory over Azerbaijani club Khazar Lankaran in the second qualifying round of Europa League. On 25 August, Tonev netted his first Ekstraklasa goal of the 2012–13 season as he scored a 25-yard winning strike in a 2–1 away victory over Polonia Warsaw.

=== Aston Villa ===
On 7 June 2013, Tonev signed for Aston Villa as their first signing of the pre-season. He was recommended by former international teammate Stiliyan Petrov, a development coach at the club. He made his debut on 13 August, replacing Karim El Ahmadi for the final eight minutes of a 2–1 defeat away to Chelsea, making 17 Premier League appearances in total throughout the season.

=== Celtic ===
On 11 August 2014, Tonev moved to Scottish champions Celtic on a season-long loan deal, with an option to buy. He made his debut on 13 September, starting in a 2–1 home win over Aberdeen. Aberdeen full-back Shay Logan accused Tonev of having racially abused him during this match; Tonev denies the allegations. On 30 October 2014, Tonev was given a seven-match ban for "using abusive language of a racist nature". Celtic confirmed that they would appeal the decision, as they believe him to be innocent. Tonev then lost his appeal and Celtic decided not to take the matter any further.

=== Frosinone ===
On 27 August 2015, Tonev joined Serie A newcomers Frosinone on a permanent deal. He played his first game three days later, coming on as a substitute for Luca Paganini in a 2–0 loss against Atalanta at Stadio Atleti Azzurri d'Italia.

=== Crotone ===
On 16 July 2016, Tonev joined Serie A newcomers Crotone. He scored his first goal for the club in a 0–1 away win over Pescara on 7 May 2017.

=== Retirement ===
Tonev announced his retirement from football in March 2022, 20 months after his last official game and started his own construction business.

== International career ==
On 4 September 2009, Tonev scored his first goal for the Bulgaria U21 in the 3–0 home win against Kazakhstan U21 in a UEFA European Under-21 Football Championship qualifier. On 9 September 2009, he was sent off for a dangerous tackle on Guillermo Molins in the 90th minute of the 1–2 away loss to Sweden U21. On 9 February 2011, Tonev scored a goal in a friendly match against Cameroon.

Tonev made his debut for the Bulgaria national team in a 0–1 home loss against Wales on 11 October 2011. On 22 March 2013, he scored his first international goals as he netted a hat-trick (the first one in his career) during a 6–0 home win over Malta in the World Cup 2014 qualifying match.

Three years and a week later, he scored his first international goal since the hat-trick, to conclude a 2–0 win over neighbours Macedonia in Skopje.

== Career statistics ==
=== Club ===
Appearances and goals by club, season and competition
Club	Season	League			National cup (Note: Includes Bulgarian Cup, Polish Cup, FA Cup, Scottish Cup, Coppa Italia)		League cup (Note: Includes Scottish League Cup)		Continental		Total	
Club	Season	Division	Apps	Goals	Apps	Goals	Apps	Goals	Apps	Goals	Apps	Goals
CSKA Sofia	2007–08	A Group	2	0	0	0	—		0	0	2	0
CSKA Sofia	2008–09	A Group	17	2	0	0	—		—		17	2
CSKA Sofia	2010–11	A Group	23	2	3	0	—		8 (Note: Appearances in UEFA Europa League)	0	34	2
CSKA Sofia	Total		42	4	3	0	—		8	0	53	4
Sliven 2000 (loan)	2009–10	A Group	23	1	0	0	—		—		23	1
Lech Poznań	2011–12	Ekstraklasa	28	2	1	0	—		—		29	2
Lech Poznań	2012–13	Ekstraklasa	26	4	1	0	—		6	1	33	5
Lech Poznań	Total		54	6	2	0	—		6	1	62	8
Aston Villa	2013–14	Premier League	17	0	1	0	2	0	—		20	0
Celtic	2014–15	Scottish Premiership	6	0	2	0	1	0	4	0	13	0
Frosinone	2015–16	Serie A	22	0	0	0	—		—		22	0
Crotone	2016–17	Serie A	13	1	1	0	—		—		14	1
Crotone	2017–18	Serie A	8	0	2	0	—		—		10	0
Crotone	Total		21	1	3	0	0	0	0	0	24	1
Botev Plovdiv	2018–19	First League	9	0	3	0	—		—		12	0
Botev Plovdiv	2019–20	First League	23	2	3	0	—		—		26	2
Botev Plovdiv	Total		32	2	6	0	0	0	0	0	39	2
Career Total			217	14	17	0	3	0	18	1	255	16

=== International ===
Appearances and goals by national team and year
National team	Year	Apps	Goals
Bulgaria
Bulgaria	2011	1	0
Bulgaria	2012	8	0
Bulgaria	2013	5	3
Bulgaria	2014	3	0
Bulgaria	2015	3	0
Bulgaria	2016	5	2
Bulgaria	2017	3	0
Bulgaria	2020	1	0
Total		29	5

Scores and results list Bulgaria's goal tally first, score column indicates score after each Tonev goal.

List of international goals scored by Aleksandar Tonev
No.	Date	Venue	Opponent	Score	Result	Competition
1	22 March 2013	Vasil Levski National Stadium, Sofia, Bulgaria	Malta	1–0	6–0	2014 World Cup qualifier
2	22 March 2013	Vasil Levski National Stadium, Sofia, Bulgaria	Malta	2–0	6–0	2014 World Cup qualifier
3	22 March 2013	Vasil Levski National Stadium, Sofia, Bulgaria	Malta	5–0	6–0	2014 World Cup qualifier
4	29 March 2016	Philip II Arena, Skopje, Macedonia	Macedonia	2–0	2–0	Friendly
5	6 September 2016	Vasil Levski National Stadium, Sofia, Bulgaria	Luxembourg	4–3	4–3	2018 World Cup qualifier
