= Yacouba Sylla =

Malian footballer (born 1990)

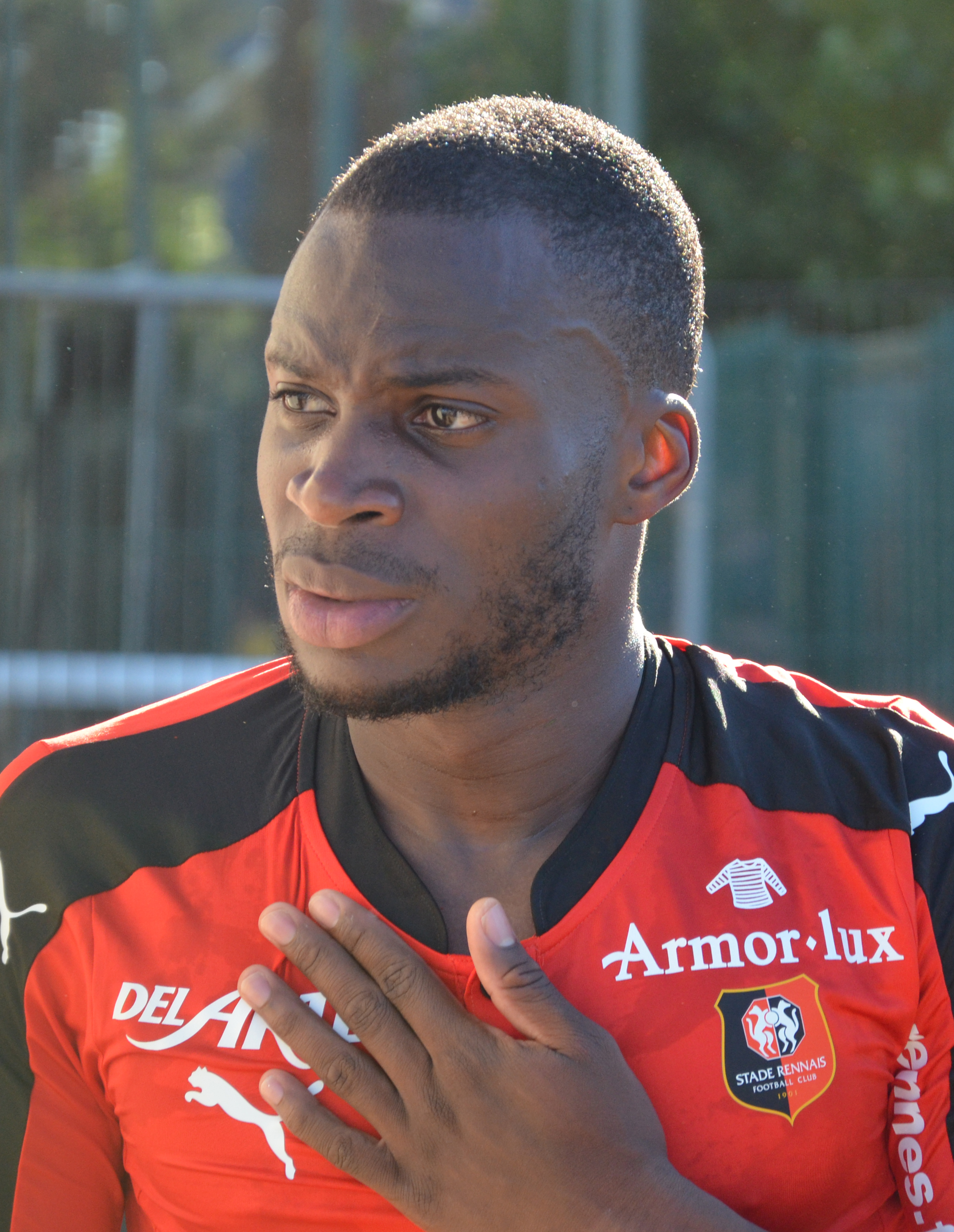
- Sylla with Rennes in 2016

Personal information
- Full name: Yacouba Sylla
- Date of birth: 29 November 1990 (age 35)
- Place of birth: Étampes, France
- Height: 1.84 m (6 ft 0 in)
- Position: Defensive midfielder

Youth career
- 1995–2002: Étampes
- 2002–2006: CSF Brétigny
- 2006–2007: Montferrand
- 2007–2008: Malesherbes
- 2008–2009: Caen
- 2009–2010: Clermont

Senior career*
Years	Team	Apps	(Gls)
2010–2013	Clermont	65	(0)
2013–2015	Aston Villa	22	(0)
2014–2015	→ Kayseri Erciyesspor (loan)	27	(1)
2015–2018	Rennes	20	(0)
2016–2017	→ Montpellier (loan)	19	(1)
2017	→ Panathinaikos (loan)	9	(0)
2018–2019	Mechelen	12	(0)
2019	Strømsgodset	10	(1)
2019–2020	CFR Cluj	4	(0)
2020–2021	MC Oujda	5	(0)
2022	Bastia	7	(0)
2022–2023	Botoșani	15	(0)
2023	Virton	3	(0)
2025	Châteauroux	0	(0)
2025	Châteauroux B	1	(0)

International career^{‡}
2011	France U21	1	(0)
2013–2017	Mali	35	(0)
- * Club domestic league appearances and goals as of 1 July 2025 ‡ National team caps and goals as of 5 September 2017

Yacouba Sylla (born 29 November 1990) is a professional footballer who plays as a defensive midfielder. Born in France, he represented France as a youth international before switching to Mali at senior level.

== Club career ==
=== Youth career ===
Prior to joining Clermont, where Sylla signed his first professional contract, he had a year's stint with Ligue 1 club Caen. Before that, Sylla had started his career with hometown Parisian club Étampes FC, before joining nearby club CSF Brétigny, which produced France internationals Patrice Evra and Jimmy Briand. After four years in Brétigny, Sylla spent the next four years roaming around clubs in the Lower Normandy region such as Montferrand, Malesherbes, and Caen. And then in 2009, he signed an amateur contract with Clermont where he was inserted into Clermont's reserve team for the 2009–10 season. He appeared in 17 matches scoring one goal.

=== Clermont ===
For the 2010–11 season, Sylla was promoted to the senior team by manager Michel Der Zakarian. He made his professional debut on 15 October 2010 in a league match against Le Mans playing the entire match in a 2–0 defeat. Sylla subsequently appeared as a starter in the team's next seven matches. His performances domestically led to interest from German club VfB Stuttgart and Italian club Udinese. In order to decrease the interest Clermont signed Sylla to his first professional contract, which ran from 22 November 2010 until June 2014.

=== Aston Villa ===
On 31 January 2013, Aston Villa completed the signing of Sylla on a three-and-a-half-year deal, subject to international clearance, after passing a medical.

==== Loan to Kayseri Erciyesspor ====
On 14 July 2014, Sylla joined Turkish Super Lig club Kayseri Erciyesspor on a season-long loan.

=== Rennes ===
On 22 June 2015, Sylla joined Rennes on a four-year deal, after two years at Aston Villa where he made only 22 league appearances.

==== Loan to Panathinaikos ====
On 30 August 2017, Panathinaikos officially announced the signing of Malian international defensive midfielder Yacouba Sylla. He joined the Greens on loan from Rennes until the end of 2017–18 season and was the 10th summer signing of the Athens club.

=== Mechelen ===
On 17 January 2018, Sylla signed a contract with YR KV Mechelen until 2021. He leaves Rennes after having been on loan at Panathinaikos since the end of August.

=== Strømsgodset ===
On 1 March 2019, Sylla signed a contract until the end of the 2020 season with Norwegian club Strømsgodset Toppfotball. On 19 May, Sylla scored his first and only goal for the Norwegians, in a 3–1 win against Tromsø IL.

=== CFR Cluj ===
On 1 July 2019, he signed a three-year contract with CFR Cluj, Romanian champions.

=== Mouloudia ===
On 27 October 2020, Sylla joined Botola side MC Oudja on a two-year deal.

=== Bastia ===
On 13 December 2021, Sylla signed for Ligue 2 side Bastia on a contract until the end of the season.

=== Botoșani ===
On 26 July 2022, Sylla joined Botoșani in Romania with a one-year contract with an option to extend.

=== Châteauroux ===
He spend one and a half year as a free agent, before he on 7 January 2025, signed with Championnat National club LB Châteauroux.

== International career ==
=== France ===
Sylla was born in France but has Malian heritage, which meant that he was eligible to represent either France or Mali. He made one appearance for France's under-21 team on 24 March 2011, in a 3–2 friendly victory over Spain. Sylla was a late substitute for Antoine Griezmann and played the final few minutes of the game.

=== Mali ===
Following his move to Aston Villa and positive form towards the end to the 2012–13 season, Sylla was called up to represent Mali for the first time. He first played in an unofficial friendly against the national team of Brittany, France, a side not affiliated with FIFA or UEFA on 28 May 2013. Mali lost 1–0.

Sylla's official, full international début for Mali came on 9 June 2012 in a 1–1 FIFA World Cup qualification draw with Rwanda. Sylla replaced Wolverhampton Wanderers player Tongo Doumbia in the 70th minute. Sylla started and played the full 90 minutes in Mali's 2–2 draw with Benin seven days later, but Mali were unfortunately eliminated from the competition.

In January 2015, he participated with the Mali in his first ever 2015 African Cup of Nations. After three scoreless matches at the end of the first round, Mali emerged from the competition at the expense of a draw favourable to the Guinea.

== Personal life ==
Sylla is the older brother of the France youth international Moussa Sylla.

== Career statistics ==
=== Club ===
As of match played 8 December 2022

Appearances and goals by club, season and competition
Club	Season	League			National cup (Note: Includes Coupe de France, FA Cup, Greek Football Cup, Belgian Cup, Cupa României)		League cup (Note: Includes Coupe de la Ligue, Football League Cup)		Continental		Total	
Club	Season	Division	Apps	Goals	Apps	Goals	Apps	Goals	Apps	Goals	Apps	Goals
Clermont	2010–11	Ligue 2	20	0	1	0	0	0	—		21	0
Clermont	2011–12	Ligue 2	24	0	2	0	1	0	—		27	0
Clermont	2012–13	Ligue 2	21	0	0	0	2	0	—		23	0
Clermont	Total		65	0	3	0	3	0	0	0	71	0
Aston Villa	2012–13	Premier League	11	0	0	0	0	0	—		11	0
Aston Villa	2013–14	Premier League	11	0	1	0	2	0	—		14	0
Aston Villa	Total		22	0	1	0	2	0	0	0	25	0
Kayseri Erciyesspor (loan)	2014–15	Süper Lig	27	1	0	0	—		—		27	1
Rennes	2015–16	Ligue 1	20	0	1	0	2	0	—		23	0
Montpellier (loan)	2016–17	Ligue 1	19	1	0	0	1	0	—		20	1
Panathinaikos (loan)	2017–18	Super League Greece	9	0	2	0	—		—		11	0
Mechelen	2017–18	Belgian First Division A	9	0	—		—		—		9	0
Mechelen	2018–19	Belgian First Division B	3	0	1	0	—		—		4	0
Mechelen	Total		12	0	1	0	0	0	0	0	13	0
Strømsgodset	2019	Eliteserien	10	1	0	0	—		—		10	1
CFR Cluj	2019–20	Liga I	4	0	0	0	—		1 (Note: Appearance in UEFA Champions League)	0	5	0
MC Oujda	2020–21	Botola	5	0	0	0	—		—		5	0
Bastia	2021–22	Ligue 2	7	0	1	0	—		—		8	0
Botoșani	2022–23	Liga I	15	0	1	0	—		—		16	0
Virton	2022–23	Challenger Pro League	0	0	—		—		—		0	0
Career total			215	3	10	0	8	0	1	0	234	3

=== International ===
As of matches played on 5 September 2017

Appearances and goals by national team and year
National team	Year	Apps	Goals
Mali	2013	4	0
Mali	2014	6	0
Mali	2015	12	0
Mali	2016	6	0
Mali	2017	7	0
Total		35	0

== Honours ==
CFR Cluj

- Liga I: 2019–20
- Supercupa României runner-up: 2019
