= 2012–13 Aston Villa F.C. season =

English football club season

Aston Villa
2012–13 season
- Owner: Reform Acquisitions LLC
- Chairman: Randy Lerner
- Manager: Paul Lambert
- Stadium: Villa Park
- Premier League: 15th
- FA Cup: Fourth round
- League Cup: Semi-finals
- Top goalscorer: League: Christian Benteke (19); All: Christian Benteke (23)
- Highest home attendance: 42,084 (12 May 2013 vs Chelsea, Premier League)
- Lowest home attendance: 15,319 (28 August 2012 vs Tranmere Rovers, League Cup)
Home colours	Away colours

The 2012-13 season was Aston Villa's 21st season in the Premier League. The 2012–13 Premier League season was the club's 102nd season in the top flight, and 25th consecutive season in the Premier League. The club was managed by Paul Lambert, their third manager in three seasons, after Alex McLeish was sacked on 14 May 2012, having himself only been in charge for 11 months and 4 days. Lambert's first competitive match came on the opening day of the Premier League season on 18 August 2012, a 1–0 defeat to newly promoted West Ham United at Upton Park. Their first Premier League win came on 15 September 2012, a 2–0 victory against Swansea City at Villa Park. Lambert was handed a one-match touchline ban on 21 November 2012 for comments relating to a penalty decision in Villa's defeat to Manchester City. On his first return to Carrow Road, Lambert received a mixed reception from the Norwich fans on 11 December 2012 in a League Cup quarter-final which his Villa team won 4–1.

On 23 December 2012, Villa were defeated 8–0 against Chelsea at Stamford Bridge, the club's heaviest ever defeat in top-flight football. This was followed by consecutive home defeats, with Villa losing 4–0 to Tottenham Hotspur and 3–0 to Wigan Athletic, leading to increased pressure on Lambert's position. On 22 January 2013, Villa played Bradford City in the second leg of the League Cup semi-final at Villa Park, having lost the first round tie 3–1 at Valley Parade. The final score on the night was a 2–1 win for Villa, leaving an aggregate score of 4–3 to Bradford. Lambert kept his job despite the poor run as the team flirted with the relegation places continuously over the next few months. Lambert did however manage to get Villa to record back-to-back wins for the first time since May 2011, as they defeated fellow relegation rivals Reading and Queens Park Rangers. He then oversaw the club's biggest victory since 2008, as Villa thrashed Sunderland 6–1.

Villa finished 15th with the youngest starting eleven in the Premier League, leading to praise from pundit Alan Hansen, who said that Lambert was "a contender for "Manager of the Season." Highlights of the season included Lambert's summer acquisition of star striker Christian Benteke, the introduction of Villa's Player of the Season, goalkeeper Brad Guzan, reaching the semi-finals of the League Cup and securing Villa's place in the Premier League for the 2013–14 season. An under-21 Aston Villa team competed in the new Professional Development League 1 that replaced the Premier Reserve League. The under-19 Aston Villa team once again took part in the NextGen Series, after competing in the inaugural season and reaching the quarter finals. The team went all the way to win the competition to become only the second team to be crowned NextGen champions.

== Review ==
=== Pre-season ===
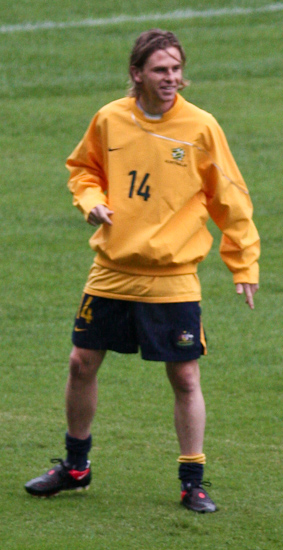
Brett Holman's transfer was announced in mid-March 2012.

The club began making plans for pre-season as early as 12 March 2012, when the free transfer of Australian Brett Holman was announced, with the player officially joining on 1 July after his deal with former club AZ expired. Later that month, the club announced a pre-season tour of the United States that would see them travelling to Chicago, Philadelphia and Portland. Following the conclusion of the previous season, Alex McLeish was sacked as manager on 14 May 2012 as a direct result – after Villa finished 16th in the league. Managerless Villa then released a number of players on 23 May 2012 after their contracts had expired. First team players released included Carlos Cuéllar, Emile Heskey and Brad Guzan, as well as a host of academy players. Villa hired Paul Lambert as their new manager on 2 June 2012, after the manager had impressed during his three-year spell at Norwich City. The move was endorsed by players and fans alike who, after the disappointing previous season, saw this as a major positive step for the club. Lambert set about making the job his, by appointing his two trusted allies: Ian Culverhouse, who became the new Villa Assistant Manager, and Gary Karsa, who was given a new role of "head of football operations" from old club Norwich as they were deemed surplus to requirements by Lambert's replacement, Chris Hughton. Long-time staff member Kevin MacDonald, who had been with the club since 1995 in a number of roles, most recently as reserve team manager but former caretaker manager in 2010, left the club on 9 June 2012. On his departure, MacDonald stated, "I've had an incredible 17 years at Aston Villa, one of the biggest clubs in the country, and wish to thank all the staff and players I have worked with during my time at the club. I wish Aston Villa every success in the future."

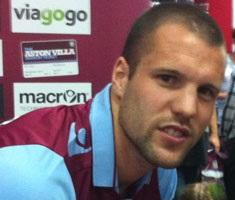
Ron Vlaar – Villa's fourth signing of the summer and new captain for the season.

Lambert made his first signing a month into his reign (2 July) at Villa, when he signed Moroccan midfielder Karim El Ahmadi from Feyenoord for an undisclosed fee, reported to be £2 million. El Ahmadi stated before his arrival that joining the club, and playing in the Premier League, would be a "dream come true" and that he was looking forward to "dictating games" for Villa. Four days later (6 July), Lambert made his second summer signing when young defender Matthew Lowton joined for an undisclosed fee, reported to be £3 million from Sheffield United Following his move to Villa, Lowton stated that he hoped to emulate former Sheffield United player Phil Jagielka in reaching the England squad. The new manager announced on 16 July that the club would be re-signing Brad Guzan on a three-year deal, after he was previously released in May. Lambert later stated that he had re-signed Guzan so that he could challenge Shay Given for the number one spot, and Guzan backed this up by declaring he had not returned to sit on the bench. 1 August 2012 saw two transfers at the club – one in, one out – as James Collins returned to his former club West Ham United for £2.5 million, to pave the way for Villa to recruit central defender Ron Vlaar from Feyenoord – the second player of the summer to join Villa from the Rotterdam club (after El Ahmadi) and the third from the Eredivisie (after El Ahmadi and Holman). The club again announced the transfer as an undisclosed fee but the media reported the deal to be worth about £3 million. Vlaar immediately declared his ambition to become a Villa great and aimed to become a club legend in central defence, just as Paul McGrath and Martin Laursen had done so previously. It was announced that Darren Bent would become Villa's new club captain whilst Stiliyan Petrov was absent, recovering from acute leukaemia.

Villa's schedule saw them kick off their pre-season at Burton Albion on 14 July, with the Villans winning 2–1 thanks to an own goal and a debut goal for Brett Holman. The Villa squad then made their way to the US for their tour with matches against Philadelphia Union, Chicago Fire and Portland Timbers. The first two games resulted in 1–0 victories for Villa, with Nathan Delfouneso and Gabriel Agbonlahor getting the goals against Philadelphia and Chicago respectively. The final game turned out to be a dramatic 2–2 draw with the Villa goals scored by defenders Ciaran Clark and new boy Matthew Lowton, who chalked up his first goal for the Claret and Blues. Ironically, both Villa goals came from set pieces, a feat Villa failed to achieve in the entirety of the last season. The Timbers equalised twice with goals from Sebastián Rincón and Rodney Wallace, which sent the game into a penalty shootout (a tradition for pre-season games in the U.S.). Villa eventually ran out winners after a tense 5–4 shootout win. The squad returned to England after staying undefeated in their tour and played their next friendly six days later against Peterborough United. The club continued their unbeaten pre-season record by recording a 2–0 win, courtesy of goals from youngster Daniel Johnson and a second goal for the club for Brett Holman. Lambert and his new look Villa side eventually suffered defeat in the next match, a 1–3 defeat by Nottingham Forest. Barry Bannan's free kick, which levelled the scores at 1–1, was not enough for the Villa after two goals from Lewis McGugan and a killer third from Marcus Tudgay sealed victory for the Championship side. The last fixture in their pre-season schedule saw Villa travel to Germany for a friendly against four-time Bundesliga champions Werder Bremen. The match was the final chance for Lambert to test out his new squad and hopefully decide his starting line up for the opening fixture against West Ham a week later. An exhilarating match that brought six goals in a 3–3 draw saw Villa lose the lead twice after initially being 1–0 down and Darren Bent grabbing a brace. Ciaran Clark scored his second goal of pre-season with Niclas Füllkrug, Eljero Elia and Aaron Hunt getting the goals for Bremen. Lambert said after that the brace for Bent would fill him with confidence ahead of the upcoming season.

=== August ===
Month	Games	Won	Drew	Lost	Scored	Conceded	Points	Other
August	3	1	0	2	4	4	0	Progression to League Cup third round

The Premier League fixture list was announced on 18 June 2012 and it gave Villa an away tie against newly promoted West Ham United to open the new season. There were no meetings between the two clubs last season as West Ham were consigned to the Championship, but ironically this was the opening fixture for Villa in the 2010–11 season which resulted in a 0–3 victory in Villa's favour, in which James Milner scored his last goal in his final appearance for the Villans before his move to Manchester City. The League Cup second round draw also took place in August with Villa being handed a home tie versus League One side Tranmere Rovers to be played on 28 August. Villa's first league game of the new season ended in defeat as they went down 0–1 to West Ham, courtesy of a Kevin Nolan strike, at Upton Park. On 24 August, the club were dealt a massive blow when promising young midfielder Gary Gardner was ruled out for the entire season with an anterior cruciate ligament (ACL) injury in his right knee. This was his second ACL injury after previously injuring his left knee, in December 2009. The same day, Jean Makoun completed a long-awaited loan move to French Ligue 1 club Rennes. After experiencing supposed work permit issues making him unable to take any part as a player of Aston Villa, Paul Lambert admitted he had never even met the player and that he was not part of his plans. A day later, Villa lost their second league game of the season 1–3 to Everton. Goals from Steven Pienaar, Marouane Fellaini and Nikica Jelavić gave the Toffees a 0–3 half-time lead, before Ciaran Clark was sent off for Villa after fouling Jelavić, who at the time was the last man. Karim El Ahmadi scored from 30 yards, his first for Villa, but ultimately it was just a consolation. Villa and Lambert's first win of the new season came in the League Cup against Tranmere Rovers. Goals from Fabian Delph, Chris Herd and a first competitive goal since February 2012 for Darren Bent sealed a 3–0 victory for the Villans. The following day, Villa signed England under-21 left back Joe Bennett from Middlesbrough on a four-year deal, for a fee rumoured to be between £2.5 and 4 million. Upon his arrival, Bennett stated, "I am really excited to have joined a massive club in Aston Villa and I'm eager to fight for a starting place and get in the team." On 30 August, Villa drew Manchester City in the third round of the League Cup. The match took place on 25 September at the Etihad Stadium.

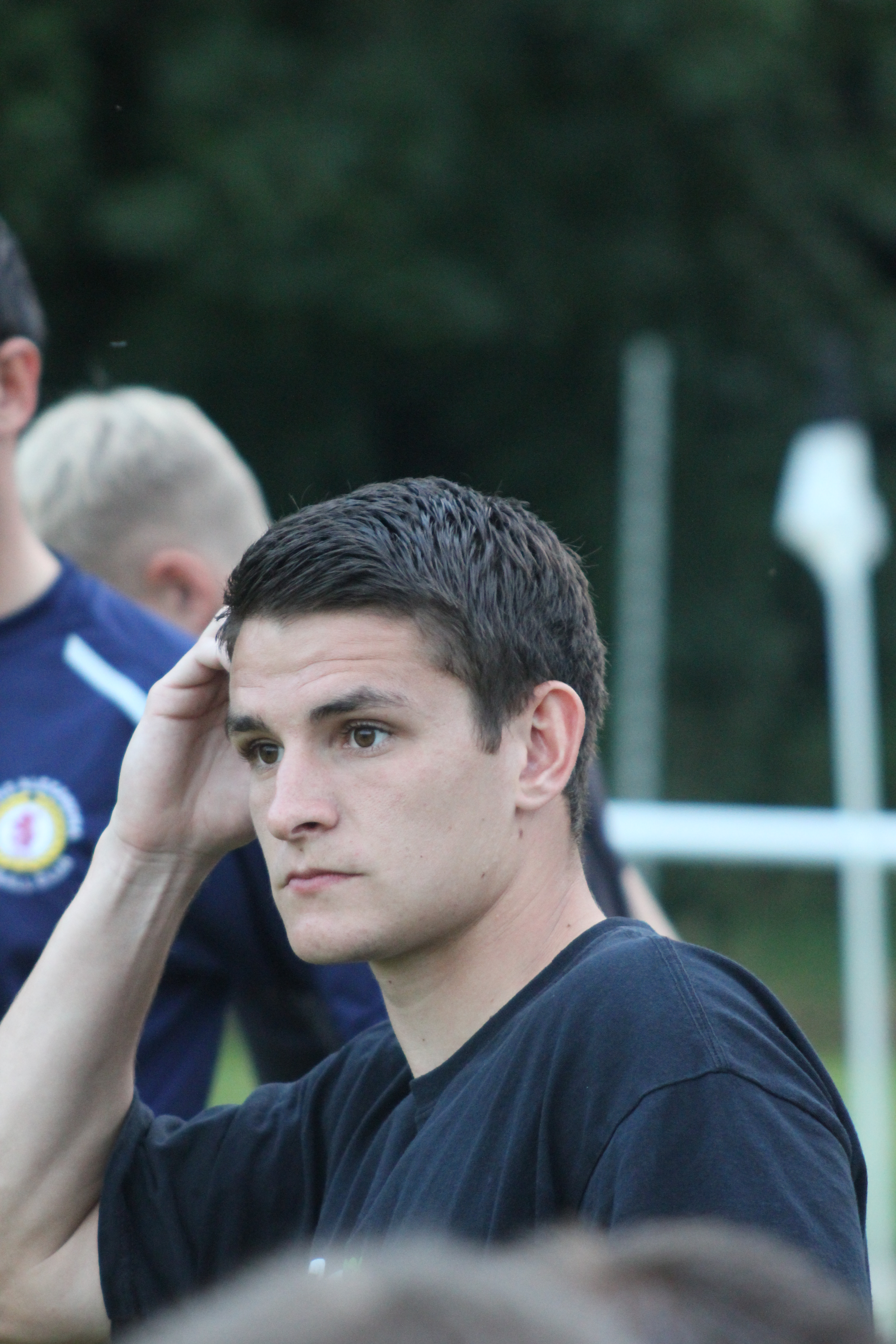
Ashley Westwood

A busy summer transfer deadline day 2012, saw Villa sign three new players: midfielder Ashley Westwood signed from Crewe Alexandra on a four-year deal, and strikers Christian Benteke from K.R.C Genk and Jordan Bowery from Chesterfield. Bowery signed a three-year deal and cost the club a rumored £500,000 with the fee rising to £1 million with add ons. Benteke signed a four-year deal for a fee believed to be £7 million, making him the most expensive transfer of the window for Villa . Earlier in the day, a £7 million bid was also accepted by Fulham for American forward Clint Dempsey, but the player ultimately rejected the deal as he favoured a move to Liverpool. The move to Liverpool later fell through and the player eventually joined Tottenham Hotspur. One player also departed the club, as Nathan Delfouneso joined Blackpool on a season-long loan.

Pos	Team	Pld	W	D	L	GF	GA	GD	Pts	Relegation
17	Norwich City	2	0	1	1	1	6	−5	1	
18	Queens Park Rangers	2	0	1	1	1	6	−5	1	2013–14 Football League Championship
19	Southampton	2	0	0	2	2	5	−3	0	2013–14 Football League Championship
20	Aston Villa	2	0	0	2	1	4	−3	0	2013–14 Football League Championship

Updated to match(es) played on 26 August 2012. Source: Barclays Premier League
Rules for classification: 1) points; 2) goal difference; 3) number of goals scored.

=== September ===
Month	Games	Won	Drew	Lost	Scored	Conceded	Points	Other
September	5	2	2	1	9	8	5	Progression to League Cup fourth round

Villa earned their first point of the season in the next game, after drawing 1–1 with Newcastle United at the Sports Direct Arena. Ciaran Clark's first half goal was cancelled out by a wonder strike from Hatem Ben Arfa and Villa's performance was reported to be much improved after the Everton game. The draw also lifted Villa off the bottom of the table and out of the relegation zone, at this early stage. The club's first league win of the season and first in 13 league matches came two weeks later, after the international break, as they beat Swansea City 2–0 at Villa Park – a reverse score of the fixture last season. A first competitive goal for the club for Matthew Lowton, a swerving volley, and a goal on his debut for substitute Christian Benteke wrapped up the points for Villa. Ron Vlaar was named captain for the match, replacing Darren Bent, who had captained the side in the previous matches. On 21 September, Stephen Warnock joined Bolton Wanderers on a three-month loan. The left back had not made a competitive appearance beforehand after falling out of favour with the new manager. The following day (22 September), Villa suffered a shock defeat at the hands of newly promoted and bottom of the table Southampton, going down 1–4 at St Mary's. Villa took the lead through Darren Bent's first league goal of the season in the first half. However, goals from Nathaniel Clyne, a Ciaran Clark own goal and a brace, including a penalty, for Rickie Lambert saw the South Coast club emphatically earn their first points of the season. Ron Vlaar was again named Villa captain, leading it to be believed that he had replaced Darren Bent as team captain. Villa didn't let this result affect their next performance however, as they recorded a shock 2–4 victory against champions Manchester City in the League Cup on 25 September. Villa twice came back after being behind, first being 1–0 down and then 2–1 down. Mario Balotelli gave City a half time lead but a Gareth Barry own goal against his former club put Villa level. Aleksandar Kolarov scored a trademark free kick, before Gabriel Agbonlahor scored his first goal of the season to send the tie into extra time. Charles N'Zogbia netted Villa's third after Agbonlahor's shot was parried by Costel Pantilimon before Agbonlahor grabbed his second and Villa's fourth, courtesy of a deflection, sending them through to the next round. Villa's reward for defeating City was a potentially tricky away tie to League One side Swindon Town, managed by former West Ham striker Paolo Di Canio, to be played on 30 October. Villa's final game of the month was a highly anticipated West Midlands derby against early high flyers West Bromwich Albion, which ended 1–1. Each team wanted to show the other that they were the top team in the West Midlands, and Villa went about setting the Baggies straight with a dominant first half performance. However, it was West Brom who took the lead early in the second half, as James Morrison beat an attempted offside trap and crossed a low ball towards Shane Long, before Villa captain Ron Vlaar's attempted clearance hit Long's foot and rolled past Brad Guzan. Villa equalised through substitute Darren Bent in the 80th minute, after he coolly put in the rebound following a goal mouth scramble from a corner. The draw saw Villa register their worst ever start to a Premier League season, with only five points from six games.

Pos	Team	Pld	W	D	L	GF	GA	GD	Pts
13	Sunderland	5	1	4	0	5	4	+1	7
14	Liverpool	6	1	2	3	9	12	−3	5
15	Aston Villa	6	1	2	3	6	10	−4	5
16	Wigan Athletic	6	1	1	4	5	11	−6	4
17	Southampton	6	1	0	5	10	18	−8	3

Updated to match(es) played on 30 September 2012. Source: Barclays Premier League
Rules for classification: 1) points; 2) goal difference; 3) number of goals scored.

=== October ===
Month	Games	Won	Drew	Lost	Scored	Conceded	Points	Other
October	4	1	1	2	4	6	1	Progression to League Cup quarter-finals

The team began the month with a trip to north London to play Tottenham Hotspur at White Hart Lane. The match finished 2–0 to Spurs, with goals from Steven Caulker and Aaron Lennon condemning Villa to their fourth loss and continued their poor start to the season. After a two-week international break, Villa returned to league action on 20 October against Fulham at Craven Cottage. Villa continued their worst start to a season in 26 years by losing their fifth game, as a late Chris Baird goal gave Fulham a 1–0 win. This loss left Villa one place and one point above the relegation zone. On 23 October, promising youngster Daniel Johnson joined League One outfit Yeovil Town on a month's loan. The next match saw Lambert face his old club Norwich City for the first time since leaving them to join Villa in the summer. The match ended 1–1 after Christian Benteke gave Villa the lead, but Norwich replied through Michael Turner, ten minutes from time. Joe Bennett was sent off for Villa after receiving two yellow cards, with Villa leading 1–0. This result meant that Villa did not win a league match in October and had still won only one so far this season. However, Villa continued to excel in the League Cup as they knocked out Swindon Town, to advance. The match finished 3–2 to Villa but it took a 90th-minute winner from Christian Benteke to see Villa book their place in the quarter-finals. Villa had led 2–0, after goals from Benteke and Gabriel Agbonlahor, and looked to be easing to a win before Swindon managed to level the score with two quickfire goals from 18-year-old substitute Miles Storey. However, Benteke's late winner sent Villa through and made sure of their only win in October. The draw for the quarter-finals was made the following day, with Villa getting an away tie at Paul Lambert's former club Norwich to be played on 11 December.

Pos	Team	Pld	W	D	L	GF	GA	GD	Pts	Relegation
15	Wigan Athletic	9	2	2	5	10	15	−5	8	
16	Norwich City	9	1	4	4	7	18	−11	7	
17	Aston Villa	9	1	3	5	7	14	−7	6	
18	Reading	8	0	4	4	11	17	−6	4	2013–14 Football League Championship
19	Southampton	9	1	1	7	14	26	−12	4	2013–14 Football League Championship

Updated to match(es) played on 27 October 2012. Source: Barclays Premier League
Rules for classification: 1) points; 2) goal difference; 3) number of goals scored.

=== November ===
Month	Games	Won	Drew	Lost	Scored	Conceded	Points	Other
November	5	2	1	2	4	7	7	–

The month started with a victory for Villa as they ran out 1–0 winners against Sunderland, managed by former manager Martin O'Neill, at the Stadium of Light. Gabriel Agbonlahor scored the only goal of the game, his first in the league for 12 months, as Villa recorded their first away win since January. Villa hosted Manchester United in the next game, and roared into an unexpected 2–0 lead thanks to two goals from Andreas Weimann, his first goals of the season. However, two goals from substitute Javier Hernández and an own goal from Ron Vlaar gave United a 2–3 victory at Villa Park. The spirited performance the players showed in the last game (despite the loss) was soon forgotten as Villa were taught a lesson in their next match against the champions Manchester City at the Etihad Stadium. City thrashed Villa 5–0 with braces each for Sergio Agüero and Carlos Tevez, which included a highly controversial penalty and a goal from David Silva. The result meant they dropped down into the relegation places. On 22 November, Alan Hutton joined Nottingham Forest on an emergency loan until 1 January. The right-back had not made a single appearance this season and had been banished from first team training, having been made to train with the reserve squad all season. The club ended a trio of matches against former Premier League champions with a home tie against Arsenal. The match was a stalemate finishing 0–0, with Villa earning a valuable point to go a point ahead of fellow strugglers Reading, before their vital relegation scrap three days later (27 November). The month finished the way it started for Villa as they grabbed a much needed win, as well as a clean sheet, against Reading. The match ended 1–0 courtesy of a late Christian Benteke header. This result, coupled with Southampton's draw with Norwich, meant Villa entered December outside of the relegation places.

Pos	Team	Pld	W	D	L	GF	GA	GD	Pts	Relegation
15	Wigan Athletic	14	4	2	8	15	25	−10	14	
16	Sunderland	13	2	7	4	12	16	−4	13	
17	Aston Villa	14	3	4	7	11	22	−11	13	
18	Southampton	14	3	3	8	21	31	−10	12	2013–14 Football League Championship
19	Reading	13	1	6	6	16	23	−7	9	2013–14 Football League Championship

Updated to match(es) played on 28 November 2012. Source: Barclays Premier League
Rules for classification: 1) points; 2) goal difference; 3) number of goals scored.

=== December ===
Month	Games	Won	Drew	Lost	Scored	Conceded	Points	Other
December	7	2	2	3	8	18	5	Progression to League Cup semi-finals

December started with an away match against a winless Queens Park Rangers team, rooted to the bottom of the table. Brett Holman gave Villa the lead within the first ten minutes with his first goal for the club. Jamie Mackie equalised for Rangers ten minutes later and the score stayed that way until the end, finishing 1–1. The draw for the third round of the FA Cup was made the next day (2 December), with Villa getting a home tie against Championship side Ipswich Town. The match was to be played on 5 January 2013. Another draw followed the QPR game, as Villa drew 0–0 versus clean sheet specialists Stoke City at Villa Park. Darren Bent made his return for Villa, coming on as a substitute, having not played since 30 October. Villa's next match came in the form of a League Cup quarter-final against Paul Lambert's former club Norwich City. Much was made of Lambert's first return to Carrow Road, made even more intense by the reported lawsuits being filed between both parties. The Villa team made it a very happy return for Lambert, running out 1–4 winners against the Canaries. Andreas Weimann grabbed his second brace of the season and goals from Brett Holman and Christian Benteke booked Villa's place in the semi-finals for the second time in four seasons. This result filled the young Villa team with massive confidence going into their next game against Liverpool at Anfield, where they gained only their second away win of the season with a 1–3 success. A brace from Christian Benteke and a third from Andreas Weimann meant Villa had led 0–3 before Steven Gerrard scored a late consolation for the Reds. The result extended Villa's unbeaten run to six games in all competitions and lifted them up to 14th in the Premier League, their highest position since 22 September. The draw for the semi-finals of the League cup was made on 19 December, eight days after Villa had booked their place, following the Leeds United/Chelsea quarter-final. Villa will play Bradford City over two legs, the first being played away at Valley Parade on 8 January 2013, with the second at Villa Park on 22 January 2013. Villa's unbeaten run came to a shuddering halt in the last game before Christmas as the team went down 8–0 to Chelsea at Stamford Bridge, their heaviest ever defeat in the Premier League. Villa's Christmas misery continued into the next game after they were beaten 0–4 by Tottenham Hotspur. The first goal was scored by Jermain Defoe, before Gareth Bale got his first Premier League hat-trick to seal a convincing win for Spurs. Villa's festive period nightmare continued further as they lost their third game in a row against fellow strugglers Wigan Athletic, 0–3. An early goal from defender Iván Ramis and second half goals from Emerson Boyce and Arouna Koné sent Wigan above Villa in the table. Villa finished the 2012 calendar year in 17th place, only one point off the relegation places but with a much inferior goal difference than their rivals after conceding 15 goals in the three festive period games.

Pos	Team	Pld	W	D	L	GF	GA	GD	Pts	Relegation
15	Newcastle United	20	5	5	10	26	37	−11	20	
16	Wigan Athletic	20	5	3	12	22	35	−13	18	
17	Aston Villa	20	4	6	10	15	39	−24	18	
18	Southampton	19	4	5	10	26	37	−11	17	2013–14 Football League Championship
19	Reading	20	2	7	11	22	37	−15	13	2013–14 Football League Championship

Updated to match(es) played on 29 December 2012. Source: Barclays Premier League
Rules for classification: 1) points; 2) goal difference; 3) number of goals scored.

=== January ===
Month	Games	Won	Drew	Lost	Scored	Conceded	Points	Other
January	8	2	2	4	11	13	2	Eliminated from League Cup; Eliminated from FA Cup

Villa began 2013 with a 2–2 draw against Swansea City at the Liberty Stadium. Wayne Routledge gave the Swans an early lead, before an Andreas Weimann strike on the stroke of half-time brought Villa level. Villa looked to have snatched a vital win, when they earned an 84th-minute penalty (their first in almost a year) which was converted by Christian Benteke. However, a stoppage time equalizer from Danny Graham made sure the points were shared. The club gained their first win of the new year, as they beat Ipswich Town 2–1 in the FA Cup on 5 January. Villa had to come from behind however, as Michael Chopra's deflected shot gave Ipswich a half time lead. Darren Bent equalized immediately after the break with a goal against his former club and
Andreas Weimann booked Villa's place in the fourth round with an 83rd-minute winner. Villa were then drawn to face Millwall at The Den in the fourth round of the FA Cup to be played on 25 January. The first leg of the League Cup semi-final against Bradford City was next for Villa three days later. The match did not go the way Villa would have thought, wanted or hoped for though as they lost 1–3 to the Bantams at Valley Parade. Bradford took the lead early in the first half as Nahki Wells beat the offside trap to finish neatly past Shay Given after a deflected shot. Matt Duke made a series of inspired saves throughout both halves keeping Villa at bay, before Rory McArdle put Bradford 2–0 up in the 77th minute. Villa pulled a goal back five minutes later through Andreas Weimann, but Bradford regained their two-goal advantage when Carl McHugh fired a header past Given to give Bradford a shock victory and leave Villa with all the work to do in the second leg to reach the final. Villa's League Cup hangover continued as they were beaten 0–1 by fellow strugglers Southampton in a must win six-pointer. Rickie Lambert converted a highly controversial penalty won by Jay Rodriguez, who looked to have gone done with no contact under the challenge of Enda Stevens. This result meant Southampton leapfrogged Villa, who dropped back into the relegation places for the first time since November. The team then competed in a local derby against West Bromwich Albion, where they threw away a two-goal lead to draw 2–2. Christian Benteke and Gabriel Agbonlahor gave Villa a half time lead but Chris Brunt pulled a goal back immediately after the break for the Baggies. They continued to attack, controlling the game, and eventually Peter Odemwingie equalized meaning the points were shared. Villa's misery then continued, as the team was knocked out of the League Cup by fourth-tier Bradford City. After losing 1–3 in the first leg, Villa had to win by two clear goals to take the tie to extra-time. However, they could only manage a 2–1 victory (3–4 on aggregate) and exited the competition as a result. Yet more gloom and doom followed as the team were knocked out of a second cup in four days. after losing 1–2 against Millwall in the FA Cup. Darren Bent gave Villa the lead but Danny Shittu equalized five minutes later for the hosts, with Villa conceding from yet another corner. Just as a replay looked on the cards, John Marquis grabbed the winner for the Championship outfit, to send them through and pile even more pressure onto the extremely fragile Villa team and manager Paul Lambert. Villa's awful January was compounded in their last game of the month, against Newcastle United. Newcastle raced into a 2–0 half time lead after goals from Papiss Cissé and Yohan Cabaye but Christian Benteke pulled a goal back for Villa early in the second half from the penalty spot. However, it was not enough as the Toon held on for the win, despite a major Villa fightback. This result was Villa's fourth home defeat in a row.

Deadline day saw Villa make their only transfers of the January transfer window, as they signed defensive midfielder Yacouba Sylla from Ligue 2 side Clermont Foot as well as Simon Dawkins on loan from Tottenham Hotspur. Both players continued Paul Lambert's system of buying inexperienced, cheap players as opposed to the experienced players Villa desperately required. Lambert later stated that he just did not have the money to buy big names, pay high wages and compete with their rivals, with some sources stating the kitty to be as low as
£3 million.

Stephen Warnock left Villa to join Leeds United, having not made an appearance all season, after three years at the club. Alan Hutton had also left, as he joined Spanish side Mallorca on 29 January on loan until the end of the season.

Pos	Team	Pld	W	D	L	GF	GA	GD	Pts	Relegation
17	Reading	24	4	8	12	30	45	−15	20	
18	Wigan Athletic	24	5	5	14	27	45	−18	20	2013–14 Football League Championship
19	Aston Villa	24	4	8	12	20	46	−26	20	2013–14 Football League Championship
20	Queens Park Rangers	24	2	10	12	18	37	−19	16	2013–14 Football League Championship

Updated to match(es) played on 29 January 2013. Source: Barclays Premier League
Rules for classification: 1) points; 2) goal difference; 3) number of goals scored.

=== February ===
Month	Games	Won	Drew	Lost	Scored	Conceded	Points	Other
February	3	1	1	1	6	6	4	–

February started with a mixed result for Villa as they drew 3–3 with high-flying Everton. On one hand, Villa picked up a vital and unexpected point however they had led 3–1 at one point, after goals from Christian Benteke (2) and Gabriel Agbonlahor. They then conceded another goal and a stoppage time equaliser as Marouane Fellaini made sure the points were shared. This result kept Villa second from bottom in the Premier League. Villa finally ended their eight-game winless run, as well as four home defeats in a row with a 2–1 victory over West Ham United at Villa Park. A lackluster first half saw few chances for either side, with the only one of note seeing Andreas Weimann shoot wide from six yards after Jussi Jääskeläinen had spilled a Christian Benteke shot. Benteke then scored a penalty to give Villa a 74th-minute lead, before Charles N'Zogbia, who had himself won the penalty, scored a sublime free kick four minutes later. An Ashley Westwood own goal made for a nervy last few minutes but Villa held on for a precious three points, to move out of the relegation zone. Despite the brilliant win against West Ham, Villa lost their last game of the month against Arsenal 2–1 after a late winner from Santi Cazorla, leaving them in 18th place at the end of February.

Pos	Team	Pld	W	D	L	GF	GA	GD	Pts	Relegation
16	Southampton	27	6	9	12	38	49	−11	27	
17	Wigan Athletic	27	6	6	15	33	51	−18	24	
18	Aston Villa	27	5	9	13	26	52	−26	24	2013–14 Football League Championship
19	Reading	27	5	8	14	33	51	−18	23	2013–14 Football League Championship
20	Queens Park Rangers	27	2	11	14	19	43	−24	17	2013–14 Football League Championship

Updated to match(es) played on 23 February 2013. Source: Barclays Premier League
Rules for classification: 1) points; 2) goal difference; 3) number of goals scored.

=== March ===
Month	Games	Won	Drew	Lost	Scored	Conceded	Points	Other
March	4	2	0	2	6	6	6	–

Villa started March as they had ended February with defeat by one of the higher ranking sides, losing 0–1 to Manchester City at Villa Park. A Ciaran Clark slip in his own half eventually led to Carlos Tevez grabbing the winner for City. However, Villa then won back to back matches in the Premier League for the first time since May 2011, after beating two major relegation rivals in Reading and Queens Park Rangers. The Reading game marked the first time in the season that Villa had come from behind to win, eventually winning 1–2. They then managed to achieve this feat again when they defeated QPR who had led 0–1. The match eventually finished 3–2 to Villa, temporarily putting a six-point gap between themselves and the relegation zone. The next match, however, saw Villa's mini revival come to an end as they were defeated 1–2 by Liverpool at Villa Park, seeing them again slip into the relegation zone on goal difference.

Pos	Team	Pld	W	D	L	GF	GA	GD	Pts	Relegation
16	Sunderland	31	7	10	14	33	43	−10	31	
17	Wigan Athletic	30	8	6	16	36	56	−20	30	
18	Aston Villa	31	7	9	15	32	58	−26	30	2013–14 Football League Championship
19	Queens Park Rangers	31	4	11	16	28	51	−23	23	2013–14 Football League Championship
20	Reading	31	5	8	18	36	61	−25	23	2013–14 Football League Championship

Updated to match(es) played on 31 March 2013. Source: Barclays Premier League
Rules for classification: 1) points; 2) goal difference; 3) number of goals scored.

=== April ===
Month	Games	Won	Drew	Lost	Scored	Conceded	Points	Other
April	4	2	1	1	10	6	7	–

Villa started April perfectly, with a 1–3 away victory over Stoke City at the Britannia Stadium. Gabriel Agbonlahor gave Villa an early lead that lasted until the 80th minute when Michael Kightly equalised for Stoke. However, a spectacular volley from Matthew Lowton put Villa back in front with less than five minutes to go. From 30 yards out, Lowton chested down a clearance from a corner and sweetly struck the ball past goalkeeper Asmir Begović. Christian Benteke then skipped through the Stoke defence and slid the ball into the back of the net to wrap up the points for Villa, as well as the third win in their last four games. Villa drew 1–1 in their next game against Fulham, with Charles N'Zogbia giving Villa the lead but a Fabian Delph own goal meant the points were shared. Villa then faced Manchester United, with United being crowned champions if they won. They did so, 3–0, after Robin van Persie scored a hat-trick within the first 33 minutes of the game. Villa's final game of the month saw them thrash Sunderland 6–1 at Villa Park, giving them their best result of the season and of Paul Lambert's reign. The result was also Villa's biggest home win in 17 years and the first time they had scored six in a match since the 2007–08 season. Christian Benteke scored his first hat-trick for Villa, becoming the first player to do so in five years, which meant he both exceeded Dwight Yorke's record of 17 Premier League goals in a season and became the first Villa player to reach 20 goals in a season in nine years.
Gabriel Agbonlahor also scored, making him Villa's highest Premier League goalscorer with 61 goals. Captain Ron Vlaar, with his first goal for the club, and Andreas Weimann wrapped up a memorable night for Villa as they went five points clear of the drop zone and above Newcastle United on goal difference, after an 11-goal swing.

Pos	Team	Pld	W	D	L	GF	GA	GD	Pts	Relegation
14	Norwich City	35	8	14	13	33	54	−21	38	
15	Sunderland	35	9	10	16	39	51	−12	37	
16	Aston Villa	35	9	10	16	42	64	−22	37	
17	Newcastle United	35	10	7	18	43	66	−23	37	
18	Wigan Athletic	34	8	8	18	39	62	−23	32	2013–14 Football League Championship

Updated to match(es) played on 29 April 2013. Source: Barclays Premier League
Rules for classification: 1) points; 2) goal difference; 3) number of goals scored.

=== May ===
Month	Games	Won	Drew	Lost	Scored	Conceded	Points	Other
May	3	1	1	1	5	5	4	–

The first game of the month saw Villa continue their good form by beating Norwich City 1–2 at Carrow Road to send them up to 13th in the table as well as to the 40-point mark.
Gabriel Agbonlahor scored both of Villa's goals, including the 89th-minute winner, either side of a Grant Holt penalty. On 9 May, club captain Stiliyan Petrov announced his retirement from football after battling acute leukaemia for over a year. Villa added Petrov to the club's hall of fame, an honour only 12 other players have received. Villa lost their last home game of the season 1–2 against Chelsea. Both teams had a man sent off, Ramires for Chelsea and Villa's goalscorer Christian Benteke. Frank Lampard became Chelsea all-time top scorer as he scored both of their goals. Villa's final game of the season came against Wigan Athletic. Wigan had been relegated mid-week after defeat by Arsenal which confirmed Villa's safety. The match itself finished 2–2, with Villa's goals coming from Darren Bent and Ron Vlaar in either half. Villa finished the season in 15th place, five points clear of relegation.

Pos	Team	Pld	W	D	L	GF	GA	GD	Pts
13	Stoke City	38	9	15	14	34	45	−11	42
14	Southampton	38	9	14	15	49	60	−11	41
15	Aston Villa	38	10	11	17	47	69	−22	41
16	Newcastle United	38	11	8	19	45	68	−23	41
17	Sunderland	38	9	12	17	41	54	−13	39

Updated to match(es) played on 19 May 2013. Source: Barclays Premier League
Rules for classification: 1) points; 2) goal difference; 3) number of goals scored.

=== Key events ===
- 12 March 2012: Australian Brett Holman agrees to join Villa on a free transfer, when his contract expires with AZ.
- 14 May: Alex McLeish is sacked as manager, after a poor season in charge.
- 23 May: The club announces that they will be releasing 11 players, including three first-team players: Carlos Cuéllar, Emile Heskey and Brad Guzan.
- 2 June: Villa appoint Paul Lambert as their new manager, on a three-year deal.
- 9 June: Reserve team coach Kevin MacDonald leaves the club after 17 years.
- 1 July: Brett Holman officially joins Aston Villa.
- 2 July: Karim El Ahmadi signs from Feyenoord for an undisclosed fee, believed to be £2 million.
- 5 July: Ian Culverhouse and Gary Karsa join the backroom staff as Assistant Manager and Head of Football Operation respectively.
- 6 July: Matthew Lowton completes a move from Sheffield United for an undisclosed fee, believed to be £3 million.
- 16 July: Brad Guzan signs a new three-year contract to re-sign for Villa, after his release in May.
- 1 August: Central defender James Collins departs to West Ham United for £2.5 million, while his replacement Ron Vlaar joins the club for £3.2 million.
- 15 August: Villa draw Tranmere Rovers, of League One, in the second round of the League Cup.
- 18 August: Villa lose 1–0 in their opening fixture of the new season, against newly promoted West Ham United. Darren Bent is appointed captain for the match, and is likely to remain so for the season whilst Stiliyan Petrov recovers from leukaemia.
- 24 August: Cameroonian Jean Makoun leaves on loan for a second season running, this time joining Rennes until the end of the season. Meanwhile, young midfielder Gary Gardner is ruled out for the rest of the season after suffering an anterior cruciate ligament injury – the second of his career.
- 28 August: Villa make it through to the third round of the League Cup, after a 3–0 win against Tranmere Rovers.
- 29 August: England under-21 left back Joe Bennett joins from Middlesbrough, with the fee rumoured to be between £2.5 and 4 million.
- 30 August: Villa draw champions Manchester City in the third round of the League Cup, to be played on 25 September.
- 31 August: On transfer deadline day, Villa sign strikers Christian Benteke and Jordan Bowery from Genk and League Two side Chesterfield respectively, with Benteke costing Villa £7 million. Bowery signed officially for an undisclosed fee rumoured to be £500,000 rising to £1 million based on appearances. The club also recruited 22-year-old Crewe Alexandra captain Ashley Westwood for an undisclosed fee rumoured to be £2 million. A£7 million bid was accepted for American forward Clint Dempsey by Fulham but the player rejected the move. Nathan Delfouneso leaves on a season-long loan to Blackpool.
- 2 September: Villa earn their first point of the season, after drawing 1–1 with Newcastle United.
- 15 September: Villa end a club record 13 game winless streak in the league, as they gain their first win of the season by defeating Swansea City 2–0. Ron Vlaar replaces Darren Bent as captain for the season.
- 21 September: Out of favour left back, Stephen Warnock, joins Bolton Wanderers on a three-month loan.
- 25 September: Villa book their place in the fourth round of the League Cup, by knocking out Manchester City after a 2–4 win in extra time.
- 26 September: The fourth round draw for the League Cup sees Villa pitted against Swindon Town, in an away draw to be played on 30 October.
- 27 October: Villa's 1–1 draw with Norwich City.
- 30 October: Villa get through to the League Cup quarter-finals after a tightly fought game against Swindon Town ended in a 3–2 victory.
- 31 October: Villa draw Norwich City in the League Cup quarter-finals to be played at Carrow Road on 11 December.
- 3 November: Villa gain their first away win since January, after defeating Sunderland 0–1 at the Stadium of Light.
- 22 November: Alan Hutton leaves Villa to go on loan to Nottingham Forest until 1 January.
- 27 November: The vital relegation scrap with Reading ends in a 1–0 win for Villa, pulling them out of the relegation zone.
- 2 December: Villa are drawn against Ipswich Town in the third round of the FA Cup, to be played on 5 January 2013.
- 11 December: Villa reach the semi-finals of the League Cup, after a 1–4 victory over Norwich City.
- 19 December: Villa will face the remaining lowest ranked team, Bradford City, in the League Cup semi-finals over two legs in January 2013.
- 23 December: Villa suffer their heaviest ever Premier League defeat at the hands of Chelsea, the match finishes 8–0.
- 29 December: Villa end their annus horribilis of 2012 one point above the relegation zone with a far inferior goal difference after conceding 15 goals in three games, the latest in a 0–3 home defeat by Wigan Athletic.
- 5 January 2013: Villa are through to the fourth round of the FA Cup after beating Ipswich Town 2–1.
- 6 January: Villa will face Millwall away in the fourth round of the FA Cup on 25 January.
- 8 January: Villa suffer a shock defeat in their League Cup semi-final first leg against Bradford City, losing 3–1.
- 22 January: Villa are knocked out of the League Cup, after losing 3–4 on aggregate to Bradford City.
- 25 January: Villa exit a second cup competition in four days, as they are beaten 2–1 by Championship side Millwall.
- 29 January: Villa end a disastrous month with which has seen them knocked out of both cup competitions and enter the relegation zone yet again, with a 1–2 defeat by Newcastle United at Villa Park. Alan Hutton is loaned out to Mallorca until the end of the season.
- 31 January: Villa complete the signing of Yacouba Sylla from Clermont Foot and loan Simon Dawkins from Tottenham Hotspur until the end of the season. Stephen Warnock departs to Leeds United.
- 10 February: Villa end an eight-game winless run, as well as both climbing out of the relegation zone and preventing their worst home run in 50 years (five defeats in a row), with a 2–1 victory over West Ham United.
- 16 March: Villa record their first back-to-back wins since May 2011 as they beat relegation rivals Queens Park Rangers 3–2, having beaten Reading 1–2 at the Madejski Stadium the previous week.
- 6 April: Villa record their third win in four games after beating Stoke City 1–3, which included a Goal of the Season contender from Matthew Lowton. The result lifts Villa to 16th place, two points above the relegation zone.
- 29 April: Villa record their best result of the season after thrashing Sunderland 6–1. Christian Benteke scores his first hat-trick for the club and also reaches the 20 goal mark in the process.
- 4 May: Villa reach 40 points after a 1–2 victory over Norwich City.
- 9 May: Club captain Stiliyan Petrov announces his retirement from football after his battle with acute leukaemia.
- 14 May: Villa's safety is confirmed as Wigan Athletic are relegated after a 4–1 defeat by Arsenal.
- 19 May: Villa end the season with a 2–2 away draw against Wigan Athletic at the DW Stadium. The result means Villa finish in 15th place in the Premier League.

== Players ==
=== Squad information ===
In the 2010–11 season the Premier League introduced new rules on squad lists. The rules included a cap on the number of players at 25; players under the age of 21 on 1 January of the year in which the season starts are exempt from the list of 25. A "home-grown rule" also requires clubs to name at least eight players in their squad of 25 players that have been registered domestically for a minimum of three seasons prior to their 21st birthday.

Players under 21 do not need to be named and can still be used. Squad subject to change during summer transfer window.

==== First team squad ====
Last updated on 19 May 2013

Squad No.	Name	Nationality	Position	Date of birth (age)	Signed from	Signed in	Contract ends	Apps.	Goals	Notes
Goalkeepers
1	Shay Given	(Republic of Ireland)	GK	20 April 1976 (age 50)	Manchester City	2011	2016	43	0	
22	Brad Guzan	(United States)	GK	9 September 1984 (age 42)	Chivas USA	2012	2015	56	0	Re-signed this season.^{1}
33	Andy Marshall	(England)	GK	14 April 1975 (age 51)	Coventry City	2010	2013	0	0	
39	Benjamin Siegrist	(Switzerland)	GK	31 January 1992 (age 34)	Aston Villa Academy	2012	2014	0	0	
Defenders
2	Alan Hutton	(Scotland)	DF	30 November 1984 (age 41)	Tottenham Hotspur	2011	2015	34	0	On loan at RCD Mallorca
4	Ron Vlaar	(Netherlands)	DF	16 February 1985 (age 41)	Feyenoord	2012	2015	30	2	
5	Richard Dunne	(Republic of Ireland)	DF	21 September 1979 (age 47)	Manchester City	2009	2013	111	4	Team captain.^{2}
6	Ciaran Clark	(Republic of Ireland)	DF	26 September 1989 (age 37)	Aston Villa Academy	2009	2014	79	5	
27	Joe Bennett	(England)	DF	28 March 1990 (age 36)	Middlesbrough	2012	2016	30	0	
29	Enda Stevens	(Republic of Ireland)	DF	9 July 1990 (age 36)	Shamrock Rovers	2012 (Winter)	2015	9	0	
30	Eric Lichaj	(United States)	DF	17 November 1988 (age 38)	Aston Villa Academy	2008	2013	41	2	
32	Nathan Baker	(England)	DF	23 April 1991 (age 35)	Aston Villa Academy	2009	2014	43	0	
34	Matthew Lowton	(England)	DF	9 June 1989 (age 37)	Sheffield United	2012	2016	44	2	
37	Derrick Williams	(Republic of Ireland)	DF	17 January 1993 (age 33)	Aston Villa Academy	2012	undisclosed	1	0	
Midfielders
7	Stephen Ireland	(Republic of Ireland)	MF	22 August 1986 (age 40)	Manchester City	2010	2014	49	1	
8	Karim El Ahmadi	(Morocco)	MF	27 January 1985 (age 41)	Feyenoord	2012	2015	23	1	
10	Charles N'Zogbia	(France)	MF	28 May 1986 (age 40)	Wigan Athletic	2011	2016	58	5	
12	Marc Albrighton	(England)	MF	18 November 1989 (age 37)	Aston Villa Academy	2009	2014	80	9	
14	Brett Holman	(Australia)	MF	27 March 1984 (age 42)	AZ	2012	undisclosed	29	2	
15	Ashley Westwood	(England)	MF	1 April 1990 (age 36)	Crewe Alexandra	2012	2016	31	0	
16	Fabian Delph	(England)	MF	21 November 1989 (age 36)	Leeds United	2009	2015	69	0	
17	Jean Makoun	(Cameroon)	MF	29 May 1983 (age 43)	Lyon	2011 (Winter)	2014	11	0	On loan to Stade Rennais.
18	Yacouba Sylla	(Mali)	MF	29 November 1990 (age 35)	Clermont Foot	2013 (Winter)	2016	11	0	
19	Stiliyan Petrov	(Bulgaria)	MF	5 July 1979 (age 47)	Celtic	2006	2013	218	12	Petrov was club captain but retired on 9 May 2013.^{2}
25	Barry Bannan	(Scotland)	MF	1 December 1989 (age 36)	Aston Villa Academy	2008	2014	82	2	
31	Chris Herd	(Australia)	MF	4 April 1989 (age 37)	Aston Villa Academy	2008	2015	40	2	
38	Gary Gardner	(England)	MF	29 June 1992 (age 34)	Aston Villa Academy	2011	2014	18	0	
40	Samir Carruthers	(Republic of Ireland)	MF	4 April 1993 (age 33)	Aston Villa Academy	2012	undisclosed	3	0	
Forwards
9	Darren Bent	(England)	FW	6 February 1984 (age 42)	Sunderland	2011 (Winter)	2015	64	25	
11	Gabriel Agbonlahor	(England)	FW	13 October 1986 (age 40)	Aston Villa Academy	2005	2015	285	72	
20	Christian Benteke	(Belgium)	FW	3 December 1990 (age 35)	Racing Genk	2012	2016	39	23	
21	Jordan Bowery	(England)	FW	2 July 1991 (age 35)	Chesterfield	2012	2015	12	0	
23	Nathan Delfouneso	(England)	FW	2 February 1991 (age 35)	Aston Villa Academy	2008	2014	44	9	On loan to Blackpool.
24	Simon Dawkins	(England)	FW	1 December 1987 (age 38)	Tottenham Hotspur	2013 (Winter)	2013	4	0	On from Tottenham Hotspur
26	Andreas Weimann	(Austria)	FW	5 August 1991 (age 35)	Aston Villa Academy	2010	2014	49	13	
36	Graham Burke	(Republic of Ireland)	FW	21 December 1993 (age 32)	Aston Villa Academy	2012	undisclosed	2	0	

- ^{1} Guzan was originally signed in 2008 but then released in May 2012, before being re-signed in July 2012 on a new three-year contract.
- ^{2} Petrov was Aston Villa's club captain, but Vlaar was appointed "team captain" for the season, as Petrov was in remission from leukaemia. Darren Bent was originally named team captain, but Vlaar replaced him from 15 September

==== Reserve squad ====
Players listed in bold are also part of the first team squad, as listed on the club's official website.
Note: Flags indicate national team as defined under FIFA eligibility rules; some limited exceptions apply. Players may hold more than one non-FIFA nationality.

No.	Pos.	Nation	Player
35	MF	JAM	**Daniel Johnson**
36	FW	EIR	**Graham Burke**
37	DF	EIR	**Derrick Williams**
39	GK	SUI	**Benjamin Siegrist**
40	MF	EIR	**Samir Carruthers**
45	DF	EIR	Daniel Devine
47	MF	ESP	Juan Serrano

No.	Pos.	Nation	Player
50	MF	HUN	András Stieber
—	GK	SCO	Calum Barrett
—	DF	LCA	Janoi Donacien
—	MF	NIR	Josh Barton
—	MF	ENG	Courtney Cameron
—	FW	EIR	Michael Drennan

=== Squad numbers ===
Dutchman Ron Vlaar takes over the vacant number 4 after his move from Feyenoord and Ciaran Clark receives the number 6 after James Collins' departure to West Ham. New striker Jordan Bowery takes over Clark's number 21, while new signing Karim El Ahmadi receives the number 8 shirt for this season, last worn by Jermaine Jenas after his short loan spell at Villa last season. Fellow new recruits Brett Holman and Matthew Lowton have been handed the number 14 and 34 shirts respectively. The former occupier of number 14, Nathan Delfouneso, now takes the number 23 shirt as a result of Holman's arrival. Brad Guzan retains the number 22 after being re-signed by Paul Lambert, having previously been released in May 2012.

Deadline day signings Ashley Westwood and Christian Benteke will wear number 15 and 20 respectively, whilst Joe Bennett acquires the number 27.

Young goalkeeper Benjamin Siegrist has been promoted to the first team for this season and has been handed number 39.

Player	Position	Previous squad number	New squad number	Previous player to wear number	Notes	Source
(Netherlands) Ron Vlaar	DF	N/A	4	(England) Steve Sidwell (2009–10 season)	Squad number was vacant upon player's arrival.	
(Republic of Ireland) Ciaran Clark	DF	21	6	(Wales) James Collins (2011–12 season)		
(Morocco) Karim El Ahmadi	MF	N/A	8	(England) Jermaine Jenas (2011–12 season)	Squad number was vacant upon player's arrival.	
(Australia) Brett Holman	FW	N/A	14	(England) Nathan Delfouneso (2011–12 season)	Delfouneso vacated the No. 14 upon Holman's arrival.	
(England) Ashley Westwood	MF	N/A	15	(England) Curtis Davies (2009–10 season)	Squad number was vacant upon player's arrival.	
(Mali) Yacouba Sylla	MF	N/A	18	(England) Emile Heskey (2011–12 season)	Squad number was vacant upon player's arrival.	
(Belgium) Christian Benteke	FW	N/A	20	(Republic of Ireland) Robbie Keane (2011–12 season)	Squad number was vacant upon player's arrival.	
(England) Jordan Bowery	FW	N/A	21	(Republic of Ireland) Ciaran Clark (2011–12 season)	Squad number was vacant upon player's arrival.	
(England) Nathan Delfouneso	FW	14	23	(Senegal) Habib Beye (2011–12 season)	Squad number was previously vacant.	
(England) Simon Dawkins	FW	N/A	24	(Spain) Carlos Cuéllar (2011–12 season)	Squad number was vacant upon player's arrival.	
(England) Joe Bennett	DF	N/A	27	(England) Isaiah Osbourne (2010–11 season)	Squad number was vacant upon player's arrival.	
(England) Matthew Lowton	DF	N/A	34	(Australia) Shane Lowry (2011–12 season)	Squad number was vacant upon player's arrival.	
(Switzerland) Benjamin Siegrist	GK	N/A	39	(England) Darren Bent (2010–11 season)	Siegrist promoted to first team and received #39; squad number was previously vacant.	

== Transfers ==
=== In ===
Summer

Date	Position	Player name	Previous club	League	Transfer fee	Notes	Source
1 July 2012	MF	(Australia) Brett Holman	(Netherlands) AZ	(Netherlands) Eredivisie	Free transfer	Transfer announced on 12 March 2012; player joined following expiry of contract at AZ.	
2 July 2012	MF	(Morocco) Karim El Ahmadi	(Netherlands) Feyenoord	(Netherlands) Eredivisie	Undisclosed	Fee rumoured to be in region of £2 million.	
6 July 2012	DF	(England) Matthew Lowton	(England) Sheffield United	(England) League One	Undisclosed	Fee rumoured to be in region of £3 million.	
16 July 2012	GK	(United States) Brad Guzan	Unattached	N/A	Contract renewal	Player initially released in May, but rejoined the club on 16 July.	
1 August 2012	DF	(Netherlands) Ron Vlaar	(Netherlands) Feyenoord	(Netherlands) Eredivisie	£3.2 million		
29 August 2012	DF	(England) Joe Bennett	(England) Middlesbrough	(England) Championship	Undisclosed	Fee rumoured to be between £2.5 and 4 million.	
31 August 2012	MF	(England) Ashley Westwood	(England) Crewe Alexandra	(England) League One	Undisclosed	Fee rumoured to be in region £2 million.	
31 August 2012	FW	(England) Jordan Bowery	(England) Chesterfield	(England) League Two	Undisclosed	Fee rumoured to be £500,000, rising to £1m based on appearances.	
31 August 2012	FW	(Belgium) Christian Benteke	(Belgium) Racing Genk	(Belgium) Belgian Pro League	£7 million		

Winter

Date	Position	Player name	Previous club	League	Transfer fee	Notes	Source
31 January 2013	MF	(Mali) Yacouba Sylla	(France) Clermont Foot	(France) Ligue 2	Undisclosed	Fee rumoured to be in region of £2 million	

Total spending: ▼£22 million +

=== Out ===
Summer

Date	Position	Player name	New club	League	Transfer fee	Notes	Source
23 May 2012	GK	(United States) Brad Guzan	(England) Aston Villa	(England) Premier League	Contract renewal	Player initially released in May, but rejoined the club on 16 July.	
23 May 2012	FW	(England) Emile Heskey	(Australia) Newcastle United Jets	(Australia) A-League	Free transfer (Released)	Joined Newcastle United Jets on 21 September 2012, following release from Villa.	
23 May 2012	DF	(Spain) Carlos Cuéllar	(England) Sunderland	(England) Premier League	Free transfer (Released)	Joined Sunderland on 2 July 2012, following release from Villa.	
23 May 2012	MF	(England) Ebby Nelson-Addy	(England) Loughborough University	(England) Midland Alliance	Released	Academy player; joined Loughborough University in November 2012, following release from Villa.	
23 May 2012	FW	(England) Connor Taylor	(England) Walsall	(England) League One	Free transfer (Released)	Academy player; joined Walsall on 29 July 2012, following release from Villa.	
23 May 2012	DF	(England) Charlie Ward	Unattached	TBD	Free transfer (Released)	Academy player	
23 May 2012	DF	(Australia) Reece Caira	(Australia) Western Sydney Wanderers	(Australia) A League	Free transfer (Released)	Academy player; joined WSW on 2 August 2012, following release from Villa.	
23 May 2012	DF	(Republic of Ireland) Richard Bryan	(England) Hinckley United	(England) Conference North	Free transfer (Released)	Academy player; joined Hinckley United, following release from Villa.	
23 May 2012	GK	(England) Matthew Coton	(England) Rushall Olympic	(England) Northern Premier League Premier Division	Free transfer (Released)	Academy player	
23 May 2012	FW	(England) Darious Darkin	(England) Hinckley United	(England) Conference North	Free transfer (Released)	Academy player; joined Hinckley United, following release from Villa.	
23 May 2012	DF	(England) Seb Jenkins	Unattached	TBD	Released	Academy player	
1 August 2012	DF	(Wales) James Collins	(England) West Ham United	(England) Premier League	£2.5 million		

Winter

Date	Position	Player name	New club	League	Transfer fee	Notes	Source
31 January 2013	DF	(England) Stephen Warnock	(England) Leeds United	(England) Championship	Free transfer		

Total income: ▲£2.5 million

=== Loans ===
==== In ====
Winter

Date	Position	Player name	New club	League	Duration	Return Date	Notes	Source
31 January 2013	FW	(England) Simon Dawkins	(England) Tottenham Hotspur	(England) Premier League	6 months	June 2013		

==== Out ====
Summer

Date	Position	Player name	New club	League	Duration	Return Date	Notes	Source
24 August 2012	MF	(Cameroon) Jean Makoun	(France) Rennes	(France) Ligue 1	Season-long	June 2013		
31 August 2012	FW	(England) Nathan Delfouneso	(England) Blackpool	(England) Championship	Season-long	June 2013		
21 September 2012	DF	(England) Stephen Warnock	(England) Bolton Wanderers	(England) Championship	3 months	22 December 2012		

Winter

Date	Position	Player name	New club	League	Duration	Return Date	Notes	Source
23 October 2012	MF	(England) Daniel Johnson	(England) Yeovil Town	(England) League One	1 month	21 November 2012		
22 November 2012	DF	(Scotland) Alan Hutton	(England) Nottingham Forest	(England) Championship	1 month	1 January 2012		
29 January 2013	DF	(Scotland) Alan Hutton	(Spain) Mallorca	(Spain) La Liga	6 months	June 2013		

== Club ==
=== Kit ===
Home	Home Alt.	Away

1ª Goalkeeper	2ª Goalkeeper	3ª Goalkeeper

=== Sponsorship ===
In February 2012, it was announced that Aston Villa will have a new kit sponsor for this season, ending the existing deal with Nike that has been running since 2007. Italian sportswear manufacturer Macron will produce the club's playing and training kits from 2012 to 2013. Villa will become Macron's flagship club in the United Kingdom, and the deal will see the latter producing a full fashion range alongside kit commitments for the managerial and playing staff.

Villa's club sponsorship deal with Malaysian-based group Genting Casinos will also continue.

=== Managerial changes ===
The club have appointed a new manager for this season (the third in a row) after Alex McLeish was sacked on 14 May 2012. McLeish only lasted eleven months in charge after replacing Gérard Houllier in June 2011.

He was replaced by fellow Scot Paul Lambert on 2 June, who was signed from Norwich City. Lambert remained as Aston Villa manager for the entire season.

Date of vacancy	Outgoing manager	Date of appointment	Incoming manager	Previous club	Notes	Source
14 May 2012	(Scotland) Alex McLeish	2 June 2012	(Scotland) Paul Lambert	(England) Norwich City		

== Season statistics ==
=== Appearances ===
Number	Nation	Name	Premier League		FA Cup		League Cup		Total		Notes
Number	Nation	Name	Start	Sub	Start	Sub	Start	Sub	Start	Sub	
Goalkeepers
1	(Republic of Ireland)	Given	2	–	2	–	5	–	9	0	
22	(United States)	Guzan	36	–	–	–	1	–	37	0	
33	(England)	Marshall	–	–	–	–	–	–	0	0	
39	(Switzerland)	Siegrist	–	–	–	–	–	–	0	0	
Defenders
2	(Scotland)	Hutton	–	–	–	–	–	–	0	0	(Note: Loaned to Nottingham Forest on 22 November 2012, returned 1 January 2013. Loaned to Mallorca on 29 January 2013.)
3	(England)	Warnock	–	–	–	–	–	–	0	0	(Note: Loaned to Bolton Wanderers on 21 September 2012, returned 22 December. Transferred to Leeds United on 31 January 2013)
4	(Netherlands)	Vlaar	27	–	1	–	3	–	30	0	
5	(Republic of Ireland)	Dunne	–	–	–	–	–	–	0	0	(Note: Out injured all season.)
6	(Republic of Ireland)	Clark	28	1	2	–	3	–	35	0	
27	(England)	Bennett	21	4	2	–	2	–	25	4	
29	(Republic of Ireland)	Stevens	6	1	–	–	1	1	7	2	
30	(United States)	Lichaj	9	8	2	–	3	1	14	9	
32	(England)	Baker	25	1	1	–	2	–	28	1	
34	(England)	Lowton	37	–	1	–	5	–	43	0	
37	(Republic of Ireland)	Williams	–	1	–	–	–	–	0	1	
Midfielders
7	(Republic of Ireland)	Ireland	9	4	–	1	3	–	12	5	
8	(Morocco)	El Ahmadi	12	8	–	–	3	–	15	7	
10	(France)	N'Zogbia	11	10	2	–	3	2	15	12	
12	(England)	Albrighton	4	5	1	–	–	1	5	6	
14	(Australia)	Holman	16	11	–	–	1	1	17	12	
15	(England)	Westwood	28	2	1	–	–	–	28	2	
16	(England)	Delph	19	5	2	–	4	1	25	5	
17	(Cameroon)	Makoun	–	–	–	–	–	–	0	0	(Note: Loaned to Rennes until the end of the season on 24 August 2012.)
18	(Mali)	Sylla	7	4	–	–	–	–	8	3	(Note: Signed from Clermont Foot on 31 January 2013.)
19	(Bulgaria)	Petrov	–	–	–	–	–	–	0	0	(Note: Petrov was in remission during season after being diagnosed with leukemia in March 2012. He then retired on 9 May 2013)
25	(Scotland)	Bannan	18	6	1	1	3	–	24	6	
31	(Australia)	Herd	9	–	–	–	3	1	12	1	
35	(England)	Johnson	–	–	–	–	–	–	0	0	(Note: Loaned to Yeovil Town on 23 October 2012. Returned 21 November.)
38	(England)	Gardner	–	2	–	–	–	–	0	2	(Note: Out injured from August–March.)
40	(Republic of Ireland)	Carruthers	–	–	–	–	–	–	0	0	
Forwards
9	(England)	Bent	8	8	2	–	2	2	12	10	
11	(England)	Agbonlahor	24	4	–	1	3	–	27	5	
20	(Belgium)	Benteke	32	2	–	–	5	–	39	2	
21	(England)	Bowery	3	7	1	1	–	–	4	8	
23	(England)	Delfouneso	1	–	–	–	–	–	1	0	(Note: Loaned to Blackpool until the end of the season on 31 August 2012.)
24	(England)	Dawkins	–	4	–	–	–	–	0	4	(Note: Loaned from Tottenham Hotspur until the end of the season on 31 January 2013.)
26	(Austria)	Weimann	26	4	1	1	4	2	30	7	
36	(Republic of Ireland)	Burke	–	–	–	–	–	2	0	2	

Last updated: 19 May 2013
Source: Squad stats and Start formations.
Only competitive matches.
Using the most used start formation.
Ordered by position on pitch (from back right to front left).
Players listed are those who have most appearances in respected positions.
Includes Cup competitions as well (League Cup & FA Cup).

=== Captains ===
No.	P	Name	Country	No. games	Notes
4	DF	Vlaar	(Netherlands)	28	Team captain^{1}
6	DF	Clark	(Republic of Ireland)	11	Team captain
9	FW	Bent	(England)	4	Team captain^{1}
11	FW	Agbonlahor	(England)	3	Team captain

Last updated: 19 May 2013
Source: Competitive match reports.
Competitive matches only
Matches started as captain only
Country: FIFA nationality; No.: Squad number; P: Position; Name: Player name; No. Games: Number of games started as captain.

^{1} Bent was originally named as Stiliyan Petrov's successor for the season but Vlaar replaced him from 15 September 2012.

=== Goalscorers ===
Correct as of 19 May 2013
Players with the same number of goals are listed by their position on the club's official website Source
Players highlighted in light grey denote the player had scored for the club before leaving for another club
Players highlighted in light cyan denote the player has scored for the club after arriving at Aston Villa during the season
Players highlighted in Blonde denote the player has scored for the club before leaving the club on loan for part/the rest of the season

Pos.	Playing Pos.	Nation	Name	Premier League	FA Cup	League Cup	Total
1	FW	(Belgium)	Christian Benteke	19		4	23
2	FW	(England)	Gabriel Agbonlahor	9		3	12
2	FW	(Austria)	Andreas Weimann	7	1	4	12
3	FW	(England)	Darren Bent	3	2	1	6
4	MF	(France)	Charles N'Zogbia	2		1	3
5	DF	(Netherlands)	Ron Vlaar	2			2
5	DF	(England)	Matthew Lowton	2			2
5	FW	(Australia)	Brett Holman	1		1	2
6	DF	(Republic of Ireland)	Ciaran Clark	1			1
6	MF	(Morocco)	Karim El Ahmadi	1			1
6	MF	(England)	Fabian Delph			1	1
6	MF	(Australia)	Chris Herd			1	1
Own Goals						1	1
Total				47	3	17	67

=== Clean sheets ===
Includes all competitive matches.

R	No.	Pos	Nat	Name	Premier League	FA Cup	League Cup	Total
1	22	GK	(United States)	Brad Guzan	5	0	1	6
				TOTALS	5	0	1	6

As of

=== Disciplinary record ===
Correct as of 19 May 2013
Players with the same number of cards are listed by their position on the club's official website Source
Players highlighted in light grey denote the player has received a yellow/red card for the club before leaving for another club
Players highlighted in light cyan denote the player has received a yellow/red card for the club after arriving at Aston Villa during the season
Players highlighted in Blonde denote the player has received a yellow/red card for the club before leaving the club on loan for part/the rest of the season
One (red card) = Two (yellow card)

No.	Nat	Pos	Name	Premier League			FA Cup			League Cup			Total		
No.	Nat	Pos	Name	Yellow card	(yellow card) (yellow-red card)	Red card	Yellow card	(yellow card) (yellow-red card)	Red card	Yellow card	(yellow card) (yellow-red card)	Red card	Yellow card	(yellow card) (yellow-red card)	Red card
16	(England)	MF	Fabian Delph	7	–	–	–	–	–	4	–	–	11	0	0
34	(England)	DF	Matthew Lowton	10	–	–	–	–	–	–	–	–	10	0	0
6	(Republic of Ireland)	DF	Ciaran Clark	6	–	1	–	–	–	1	–	–	7	0	1
20	(Belgium)	FW	Christian Benteke	7	1	–	–	–	–	–	–	–	7	1	0
27	(England)	DF	Joe Bennett	4	1	–	1	–	–	–	–	–	5	1	0
30	(United States)	DF	Eric Lichaj	6	–	–	–	–	–	–	–	–	6	0	0
8	(Morocco)	MF	Karim El Ahmadi	5	–	–	–	–	–	1	–	–	6^{1}	0	0
11	(England)	FW	Gabriel Agbonlahor	4	–	–	–	–	–	1	–	–	5	0	0
10	(France)	MF	Charles N'Zogbia	1	–	–	–	–	–	3	–	–	4	0	0
25	(Scotland)	MF	Barry Bannan	3	–	–	–	–	–	1	–	–	4	0	0
32	(England)	DF	Nathan Baker	3	–	–	–	–	–	–	–	–	3	0	0
26	(Austria)	FW	Andreas Weimann	3	–	–	–	–	–	–	–	–	3	0	0
22	(United States)	GK	Brad Guzan	2	–	–	–	–	–	–	–	–	2	0	0
4	(Netherlands)	DF	Ron Vlaar	1	–	–	–	–	–	1	–	–	2	0	0
18	(Mali)	MF	Yacouba Sylla	2	–	–	–	–	–	–	–	–	2	0	0
15	(England)	MF	Ashley Westwood	2	–	–	–	–	–	–	–	–	2	0	0
29	(Republic of Ireland)	DF	Enda Stevens	1	–	–	–	–	–	–	–	–	1	0	0
7	(Republic of Ireland)	MF	Stephen Ireland	1	–	–	–	–	–	–	–	–	1	0	0
12	(England)	MF	Marc Albrighton	–	–	–	–	–	–	1	–	–	1	0	0
31	(Australia)	MF	Chris Herd	1	–	–	–	–	–	–	–	–	1	0	0
9	(England)	FW	Darren Bent		–	–	–	–	–	–	–	–	1	0	0
14	(Australia)	FW	Brett Holman	1	–	–	–	–	–	–	–	–	1	0	0
21	(England)	FW	Jordan Bowery	–	–	–	1	–	–	–	–	–	1	0	0
			TOTALS	72	2	1	2	0	0	13	0	0	87	2	1

Notes

^{1}El Ahmadi received his fifth yellow card of the season against Swindon Town on 30 October 2012. This was not documented on the BBC match report, though the suspension was served.

=== Home attendances ===
Correct as of 11 May 2013
Win Draw Loss

Comp	Week/Round	Date	Score	Opponent	Attendance
Premier League	Wk 2	25 August 2012	1–3	Everton	36,565
League Cup	Rd 2	28 August 2012	3–0	Tranmere Rovers	15,319
Premier League	Wk 4	15 September 2012	2–0	Swansea City	34,005
Premier League	Wk 6	30 September 2012	1–1	West Bromwich Albion	34,489
Premier League	Wk 9	27 October 2012	1–1	Norwich City	33,184
Premier League	Wk 11	10 November 2012	2–3	Manchester United	40,538
Premier League	Wk 13	24 November 2012	0–0	Arsenal	34,607
Premier League	Wk 14	27 November 2012	1–0	Reading	28,692
Premier League	Wk 16	8 December 2012	0–0	Stoke City	30,110
Premier League	Wk 19	26 December 2012	0–4	Tottenham Hotspur	36,863
Premier League	Wk 20	29 December 2012	0–3	Wigan Athletic	33,374
FA Cup	Rd 3	5 January 2013	2–1	Ipswich Town	24,854
Premier League	Wk 22	12 January 2013	0–1	Southampton	32,500
League Cup	SF (2)	22 January 2013	2–1	Bradford City	40,193
Premier League	Wk 24	29 January 2013	1–2	Newcastle United	30,334
Premier League	Wk 26	10 February 2013	2–1	West Ham United	30,503
Premier League	Wk 28	2 March 2013	0–1	Manchester City	33,217
Premier League	Wk 30	10 March 2013	3–2	Queens Park Rangers	38,594
Premier League	Wk 31	31 March 2013	1–2	Liverpool	42,037
Premier League	Wk 33	13 April 2013	1–1	Fulham	37,011
Premier League	Wk 35	29 April 2013	6–1	Sunderland	37,428
Premier League	Wk 37	11 May 2013	1–2	Chelsea	42,084
				Total Attendance	746,501
				Average League Attendance	35,509
				Average Attendance	33,932

== Competitions ==
=== Overall ===
Competition	Started round	Final position / round	First match	Last match
Premier League	—	15th	18 August 2012	19 May 2013
League Cup	2nd round	Semi-finals	28 August 2012	22 January 2013
FA Cup	3rd round	4th Round	5 January 2013	25 January 2013

Updated to match played 19 May 2013
Source: Competitions

==== Preseason ====
Win Draw Loss Postponed

14 July 2012	Burton Albion	1–2	Aston Villa	Burton upon Trent
15:00 UTC±0	Weir 9'	Report	Holness 42' (o.g.); Holman 83'	Stadium: Pirelli Stadium; Attendance: 4,165; Referee: Kevin Friend

1 August 2012	Peterborough United	0–2	Aston Villa	Peterborough
19:45 UTC±0		Report	Johnson 39'; Holman 81'	Stadium: London Road Stadium; Attendance: 2,071; Referee: Andy Woolmer

4 August 2012	Nottingham Forest	3–1	Aston Villa	Nottingham
15:00 UTC±0	McGugan 71', 85'; Tudgay 77'	Report	Bannan 73'	Stadium: City Ground; Attendance: 12,442; Referee: Stuart Attwell

11 August 2012	Werder Bremen (Germany)	3–3	Aston Villa	Bremen
18:00 UTC+1	Füllkrug 11'; Elia 52'; Hunt 71'	Report	Bent 16', 68'; Clark 22'	Stadium: Weserstadion; Attendance: 22,800

US tour On 27 March 2012, the club announced plans for a pre-season tour of the US as part of the preparations for the 2012–13 season. The tour saw the club taking on Major League Soccer clubs from the three US cities of Portland, Chicago and Philadelphia between 18 and 24 July 2012.

Villa won all three matches, after 1–0 victories over both Philadelphia Union and Chicago Fire and a penalty shootout victory after an initial 2–2 draw with Portland Timbers.

18 July 2012	Philadelphia Union (United States)	0–1	Aston Villa	Chester, PA
UTC−04:00		Report	Delfouneso 43'	Stadium: PPL Park; Attendance: 17,195

21 July 2012	Chicago Fire (United States)	0–1	Aston Villa	Bridgeview, IL
UTC−05:00		Report	Agbonlahor 39'	Stadium: Toyota Park; Attendance: 16,388; Referee: Daniel Fitzgerald (United States)

24 July 2012	Portland Timbers (United States)	2–2 (4–5 p)	Aston Villa	Portland, OR
UTC−07:00	Rincón 76'; Wallace 81'	Report	Clark 42'; Lowton 80'	Stadium: Jeld-Wen Field; Attendance: 20,438; Referee: Juan Guzmán (United States)
	Penalties
	Rincón (penalty scored); Jean-Baptiste (penalty scored); Songo'o (penalty scored); Renken (penalty scored); Dike (penalty missed)		(penalty scored) Bannan; (penalty scored) Lichaj; (penalty scored) Gardner; (penalty scored) N'Zogbia; (penalty scored) Carruthers

=== Premier League ===
==== League table ====
Pos	Team	Pld	W	D	L	GF	GA	GD	Pts
13	Stoke City	38	9	15	14	34	45	−11	42
14	Southampton	38	9	14	15	49	60	−11	41
15	Aston Villa	38	10	11	17	47	69	−22	41
16	Newcastle United	38	11	8	19	45	68	−23	41
17	Sunderland	38	9	12	17	41	54	−13	39

Source: Barclays Premier League
Rules for classification: 1) Points; 2) Goal difference; 3) Goals scored; 4) Play-offs (only if needed to decide champion, teams for relegation or teams for UEFA competitions).

Games played	46 (38 Premier League, 2 FA Cup, 6 League Cup)
Games won	16 (10 Premier League, 1 FA Cup, 5 League Cup)
Games drawn	11 (11 Premier League)
Games lost	19 (17 Premier League, 1 League Cup, 1 FA Cup)
Goals scored	67 (47 Premier League, 3 FA Cup, 17 League Cup)
Goals conceded	81 (69 Premier League, 3 FA Cup, 9 League Cup)
Total goal difference	−14 (−22 Premier League, 0 FA Cup, +8 League Cup)
Clean sheets	6 (5 Premier League, 1 League Cup)
Yellow Cards	87 (72 Premier League, 2 FA Cup, 13 League Cup)
Red Cards	3 (3 Premier League)
Most appearances	(England) Matthew Lowton (44)
Top scorer	(Belgium) Christian Benteke (23)
Worst Discipline	(England) Fabian Delph (11 (yellow card) )
Best Result	6–1 vs Sunderland (H), Premier League (29 April 2013)
Worst Result	8–0 vs Chelsea (A), Premier League (23 December 2012)
Points	41

==== Results summary ====
Overall								Home						Away					
Pld	W	D	L	GF	GA	GD	Pts	W	D	L	GF	GA	GD	W	D	L	GF	GA	GD
38	10	11	17	47	69	−22	41	5	5	9	23	28	−5	5	6	8	24	41	−17

Last updated: 19 May 2013.
Source: Competitive matches

==== Results by matchday ====
Match	1	2	3	4	5	6	7	8	9	10	11	12	13	14	15	16	17	18	19	20	21	22	23	24	25	26	27	28	29	30	31	32	33	34	35	36	37	38
Ground	A	H	A	H	A	H	A	A	H	A	H	A	H	H	A	H	A	A	H	H	A	H	A	H	A	H	A	H	A	H	H	A	H	A	H	A	H	A
Result	L	L	D	W	L	D	L	L	D	W	L	L	D	W	D	D	W	L	L	L	D	L	D	L	D	W	L	L	W	W	L	W	D	L	W	W	L	D
Position	15	20	17	13	14	15	16	17	17	17	17	18	18	17	15	16	14	16	16	17	16	18	17	19	19	17	18	18	17	17	18	16	17	17	16	13	16	15

Updated to match(es) played on 19 May 2013. Source: Premier League
A = Away; H = Home; W = Win; D = Draw; L = Loss

==== Matches ====
Win Draw Loss Postponed

18 August 2012 1	West Ham United	1–0	Aston Villa	London
15:00 BST	Nolan 40'	AVFC; BBC	Clark (yellow card) 39'	Stadium: Boleyn Ground; Attendance: 34,172; Referee: Mike Dean

25 August 2012 2	Aston Villa	1–3	Everton	Birmingham
15:00 BST	Clark (red card) 57'; El Ahmadi 74', (yellow card) 82'	AVFC; BBC	Pienaar 3'; Fellaini 31'; Jelavić 43'	Stadium: Villa Park; Attendance: 36,565; Referee: Michael Oliver

2 September 2012 3	Newcastle United	1–1	Aston Villa	Newcastle upon Tyne
16:00 BST	Ben Arfa 59'; Gutiérrez (yellow card) 85'	AVFC; BBC	Clark 22'; El Ahmadi (yellow card) 27'; Lichaj (yellow card) 90'; Guzan (yellow card) 90+2'; Holman (yellow card) 90+4'	Stadium: Sports Direct Arena; Attendance: 48,245; Referee: Lee Probert

15 September 2012 4	Aston Villa	2–0	Swansea City	Birmingham
15:00 BST	Lowton 16', (yellow card) 37'; Clark (yellow card) 25'; Lichaj (yellow card) 80'; Benteke 88'	AVFC; BBC	Michu (yellow card) 40'	Stadium: Villa Park; Attendance: 34,005; Referee: Lee Mason

22 September 2012 5	Southampton	4–1	Aston Villa	Southampton
15:00 BST	Lambert 58', 90+5' (pen.); Clyne 63', (yellow card) 65'; Puncheon 72'	AVFC; BBC	Bent 36'; Vlaar (yellow card) 43'; Lichaj (yellow card) 53'; Guzan (yellow card) 90+4'	Stadium: St Mary's Stadium; Attendance: 30,713; Referee: Jonathan Moss

30 September 2012 6	Aston Villa	1–1	West Bromwich Albion	Birmingham
16:00 BST	Delph (yellow card) 23'; Bent 80'	AVFC; BBC	Long 51'; Tamaș (yellow card) 90+4'	Stadium: Villa Park; Attendance: 34,489; Referee: Anthony Taylor

7 October 2012 7	Tottenham Hotspur	2–0	Aston Villa	London
15:00 BST	Caulker 58'; Lennon 67'; Walker (yellow card) 73'	AVFC; BBC	Delph (yellow card) 27'; Bennett (yellow card) 47'; El Ahmadi (yellow card) 57'	Stadium: White Hart Lane; Attendance: 35,802; Referee: Neil Swarbrick

20 October 2012 8	Fulham	1–0	Aston Villa	London
15:00 BST	Riise (yellow card) 70'; Baird 84'	AVFC; BBC	El Ahmadi (yellow card) 50'; Lichaj (yellow card) 77'	Stadium: Craven Cottage; Attendance: 25,693; Referee: Chris Foy

27 October 2012 9	Aston Villa	1–1	Norwich City	Birmingham
12:45 BST	Benteke 27'; Bennett (yellow card) 29' (yellow-red card) 52'; Herd (yellow card) 63'	AVFC; BBC	Turner 79'	Stadium: Villa Park; Attendance: 33,184; Referee: Phil Dowd

3 November 2012 10	Sunderland	0–1	Aston Villa	Sunderland
15:00 GMT	Bardsley (yellow card) 33'; Fletcher (yellow card) 90'	AVFC; BBC	Lichaj (yellow card) 45+3'; Agbonlahor 57'; Clark (yellow card) 69'; Benteke (yellow card) 81'	Stadium: Stadium of Light; Attendance: 41,515; Referee: Mike Jones

10 November 2012 11	Aston Villa	2–3	Manchester United	Birmingham
17:30 GMT	Weimann 45+1', 50'; Ireland (yellow card) 56'	AVFC; BBC	Hernández 58', 87'; Vlaar 63' (o.g.); Carrick (yellow card) 65'	Stadium: Villa Park; Attendance: 40,538; Referee: Kevin Friend

17 November 2012 12	Manchester City	5–0	Aston Villa	Manchester
15:00 GMT	Silva 43'; Agüero 54' (pen.), 67'; Tevez 65' (pen.), 74'	AVFC; BBC	Bannan (yellow card) 56'	Stadium: Etihad Stadium; Attendance: 47,072 (989 away); Referee: Jon Moss

24 November 2012 13	Aston Villa	0–0	Arsenal	Birmingham
17:30 GMT	El Ahmadi (yellow card) 22'	AVFC; BBC		Stadium: Villa Park; Attendance: 34,607; Referee: Lee Mason

27 November 2012 14	Aston Villa	1–0	Reading	Birmingham
20:00 GMT	Clark (yellow card) 64'; Benteke 80'	AVFC; BBC		Stadium: Villa Park; Attendance: 28,692

1 December 2012 15	Queens Park Rangers	1–1	Aston Villa	London
15:00 GMT	Mackie 18'; Derry (yellow card) 61'	AVFC; BBC	Holman 8'; Baker (yellow card) 48'; Lowton (yellow card) 63'	Stadium: Loftus Road; Attendance: 17,387; Referee: Howard Webb

8 December 2012 16	Aston Villa	0–0	Stoke City	Birmingham
15:00 GMT		AVFC; BBC	Shotton (yellow card) 75' (yellow-red card) 90+2'	Stadium: Villa Park; Attendance: 30,110; Referee: Roger East

15 December 2012 17	Liverpool	1–3	Aston Villa	Liverpool
15:00 GMT	Gerrard 87'; Suárez (yellow card) 89'	AVFC; BBC	Benteke 29', 51', (yellow card) 88'; Weimann 40'; Lowton (yellow card) 65'	Stadium: Anfield; Attendance: 44,607; Referee: Neil Swarbrick

23 December 2012 18	Chelsea	8–0	Aston Villa	London
16:00 GMT	Torres 3'; David Luiz 29'; Ivanović 34'; Lampard 59'; Ramires 76', 90+1'; Oscar 79' (pen.); Hazard 83'	AVFC; BBC		Stadium: Stamford Bridge; Attendance: 41,363; Referee: Phil Dowd
Note: Aston Villa's worst defeat in their 138-year history.

26 December 2012 19	Aston Villa	0–4	Tottenham Hotspur	Birmingham
15:00 GMT	Delph (yellow card) 69'	AVFC; BBC	Defoe 57'; Bale 61', 73', 84'	Stadium: Villa Park; Attendance: 36,863; Referee: Mark Clattenburg

29 December 2012 20	Aston Villa	0–3	Wigan Athletic	Birmingham
15:00 GMT	Bannan (yellow card) 55'; Lowton (yellow card) 80'; Weimann (yellow card) 90'	AVFC; BBC	Ramis 3'; Boyce (yellow card) 36', (goal) 52'; Maloney (yellow card) 43'; Koné 56'	Stadium: Villa Park; Attendance: 33,374; Referee: Kevin Friend

1 January 2013 21	Swansea City	2–2	Aston Villa	Swansea
15:00 GMT	Routledge 9'; Graham 90+4'	AVFC; BBC	Clark (yellow card) 40'; Weimann (yellow card) 41', (goal) 44'; Delph (yellow card) 41'; Stevens (yellow card) 45+1'; Benteke 84' (pen.)	Stadium: Liberty Stadium; Attendance: 20,406; Referee: Mark Halsey

12 January 2013 22	Aston Villa	0–1	Southampton	Birmingham
15:00 GMT	Weimann (yellow card) 90+4'	AVFC; BBC	Lambert 34' (pen.); Boruc (yellow card) 90+2'	Stadium: Villa Park; Attendance: 32,500; Referee: Mark Halsey

19 January 2013 23	West Bromwich Albion	2–2	Aston Villa	West Bromwich
17:30 GMT	Olsson (yellow card) 21'; Lukaku (yellow card) 43'; Brunt 49'; Dorrans (yellow card) 62'; Odemwingie 83'	AVFC; BBC	Benteke 12'; Agbonlahor (yellow card) 21', (goal) 31'; Lichaj (yellow card) 58'; Lowton (yellow card) 61'	Stadium: The Hawthorns; Attendance: 25,583; Referee: Lee Probert

29 January 2013 24	Aston Villa	1–2	Newcastle United	Birmingham
19:45 GMT	N'Zogbia (yellow card) 42'; Benteke 49' (pen.), (yellow card) 61'; Baker (yellow card) 67'; Lowton (yellow card) 76'; Agbonlahor (yellow card) 78'	AVFC; BBC	Cissé 19'; Cabaye 31'; Gutiérrez (yellow card) 52'; Ameobi (yellow card) 87'	Stadium: Villa Park; Attendance: 30,334; Referee: Mike Dean

2 February 2013 25	Everton	3–3	Aston Villa	Liverpool
15:00 GMT	Anichebe 21'; Fellaini 68', 90+3'; Osman (yellow card) 89'	AVFC; BBC	Benteke 2', 61', (yellow card) 45+1'; Agbonlahor 24', (yellow card) 88'; Lowton (yellow card) 63'; Sylla (yellow card) 90+6'	Stadium: Goodison Park; Attendance: 38,121; Referee: Mike Jones

10 February 2013 26	Aston Villa	2–1	West Ham United	Birmingham
13:30 GMT	Baker (yellow card) 72'; Benteke 74' (pen.); N'Zogbia 78'; Bent (yellow card) 87'; Clark (yellow card) 90+2'	AVFC; BBC	Pogatetz (yellow card) 45'; Reid (yellow card) 78'; Westwood 87' (o.g.)	Stadium: Villa Park; Attendance: 30,503; Referee: Mark Clattenburg

23 February 2013 27	Arsenal	2–1	Aston Villa	London
15:00 GMT	Cazorla 6', 85'; Diaby (yellow card) 37'	AVFC; BBC	Lowton (yellow card) 36'; Delph (yellow card) 66'; Weimann 68'	Stadium: Emirates Stadium; Attendance: 60,079; Referee: Martin Atkinson

4 March 2013 28	Aston Villa	0–1	Manchester City	Birmingham
20:00 GMT	Benteke (yellow card) 75'; Delph (yellow card) 90+3'	AVFC; BBC	Tevez 45+1'	Stadium: Villa Park; Attendance: 33,217; Referee: Mike Dean

9 March 2013 29	Reading	1–2	Aston Villa	Reading
15:00 GMT	Baker 32' (o.g.); Hunt (yellow card) 54'; McAnuff (yellow card) 87'	AVFC; BBC	Lowton (yellow card) 10'; Benteke 33', (yellow card) 67'; Agbonlahor 45'; Westwood (yellow card) 85'	Stadium: Madejski Stadium; Attendance: 24,102; Referee: Jonathan Moss

16 March 2013 30	Aston Villa	3–2	Queens Park Rangers	Birmingham
15:00 GMT	Sylla (yellow card) 31'; Bannan (yellow card) 42'; Weimann (yellow card) 45+1', (goal) 59'; Agbonlahor 45+3'; Benteke 81'	AVFC; BBC	Mbia (yellow card) 13'; Jenas 23'; Townsend 73'; Hoilett (yellow card) 88'	Stadium: Villa Park; Attendance: 38,594; Referee: Kevin Friend

31 March 2013 31	Aston Villa	1–2	Liverpool	Birmingham
13:30 GMT	Benteke 31'; Westwood (yellow card) 90+1'	AVFC; BBC	Henderson 47'; Gerrard (yellow card) 48', (goal) 60' (pen.)	Stadium: Villa Park

6 April 2013 32	Stoke City	1–3	Aston Villa	Stoke-on-Trent
15:00 BST	Shotton (yellow card) 64'; Shawcross (yellow card) 66'; Kightly 80'; Adam (yellow card) 90+2'	AVFC; BBC	Agbonlahor 9', (yellow card) 35'; Lowton 87'; Benteke 90+1'	Stadium: Britannia Stadium; Attendance: 27,544; Referee: Mark Clattenburg

13 April 2013 33	Aston Villa	1–1	Fulham	Birmingham
15:00 BST	N'Zogbia 55'; Sylla (yellow card) 69'	AVFC; BBC	Enoh (yellow card) 58'; Delph 66' (o.g.); Richardson (yellow card) 87'	Stadium: Villa Park; Attendance: 37,011; Referee: Phil Dowd

22 April 2013 34	Manchester United	3–0	Aston Villa	Manchester
20:00 BST	Van Persie 2', 13', 33'; Evra (yellow card) 28'	AVFC; BBC		Stadium: Old Trafford; Attendance: 75,591; Referee: Anthony Taylor

29 April 2013 35	Aston Villa	6–1	Sunderland	Birmingham
20:00 BST	Vlaar 31'; Weimann 37'; Benteke 55', 59', 72'; Agbonlahor 88'	AVFC; BBC	Rose 32', (yellow card) 66'; Cuéllar (yellow card) 34'; Sessègnon (red card) 70'; Bardsley (yellow card) 76'	Stadium: Villa Park; Attendance: 37,428; Referee: Lee Probert

4 May 2013 36	Norwich City	1–2	Aston Villa	Norwich
15:00 BST	Johnson (yellow card) 59'; Holt 74' (pen.); R. Bennett (yellow card) 90+5'	AVFC; BBC	J. Bennett (yellow card) 18'; Delph (yellow card) 54'; Agbonlahor 55', 89'; Benteke (yellow card) 68'	Stadium: Carrow Road; Attendance: 26,842; Referee: Kevin Friend

11 May 2013 37	Aston Villa	1–2	Chelsea	Birmingham
12:45 GMT	Baker (yellow card) 4'; Benteke 14', (yellow card) 36' (yellow-red card) 58'	AVFC; BBC	Lampard 61', 88', (yellow card) 85'; Ramires (yellow card) 16' (yellow-red card) 44'; Terry (yellow card) 42'	Stadium: Villa Park; Attendance: 42,084; Referee: Lee Mason

19 May 2013 38	Wigan Athletic	2–2	Aston Villa	Wigan
15:00 BST	Boyce 21', (yellow card) 83'; Baker 45' (o.g.); McCarthy (yellow card) 70'	AVFC; BBC	Bent 5'; Lowton (yellow card) 41'; Vlaar 61'	Stadium: DW Stadium; Referee: Neil Swarbrick

=== FA Cup ===
Round	3	4
Ground	H	A
Result	2–1	1–2

5 January 2013 Third round	Aston Villa	2–1	Ipswich Town	Birmingham
15:00 UTC±0	Bent 46'; Weimann 83'	AVFC; BBC	Kisnorbo (yellow card) 12'; Chopra 31'; Hyam (yellow card) 81'	Stadium: Villa Park; Attendance: 24,854; Referee: Jonathan Moss

25 January 2013 Fourth round	Millwall	2–1	Aston Villa	London
19:45 UTC±0	Shittu 27'; Beevers (yellow card) 81'; Marquis 89'	AVFC; BBC	Bent 22'; Bennett (yellow card) 53'; Bowery (yellow card) 82'	Stadium: The Den; Attendance: 15,007; Referee: Neil Swarbrick

=== League Cup ===
Round	2	3	4	QF	SF (1)	SF (2)
Ground	H	A	A	A	A	H
Result	3–0	4–2 (aet)	3–2	4–1	1–3	2–1

28 August 2012 Second round	Aston Villa	3–0	Tranmere Rovers	Birmingham
19:45 UTC±0	Delph 38', (yellow card) 78'; Herd 66'; Bent 81'; Bannan (yellow card) 84'	AVFC; BBC	Taylor (yellow card) 28'; Holmes (yellow card) 84'	Stadium: Villa Park; Attendance: 15,319; Referee: James Adcock

25 September 2012 Third round	Manchester City	2–4 (a.e.t.)	Aston Villa	Manchester
19:45 UTC±0	Balotelli 27'; Tevez (yellow card) 45+1'; Kolarov 64', (yellow card) 114'; Razak (yellow card) 90+5'; K. Touré (yellow card) 108'	AVFC; BBC	Delph (yellow card) 45+1'; Barry 59' (o.g.); Vlaar (yellow card) 63'; Agbonlahor 70', 113'; Albrighton (yellow card) 88'; N'Zogbia 97', (yellow card) 102'	Stadium: Etihad Stadium; Attendance: 28,015; Referee: Phil Dowd

30 October 2012 Fourth round	Swindon Town	2–3	Aston Villa	Swindon
19:45 UTC±0	Flint (yellow card) 14'; Storey 78', 81'	AVFC; BBC	Benteke 30', 90'; Agbonlahor 39', (yellow card) 78'; El Ahmadi (yellow card) 86'	Stadium: County Ground; Attendance: 14,434; Referee: Stuart Attwell

11 December 2012 Quarter-finals	Norwich City	1–4	Aston Villa	Norwich
19:45 UTC±0	Morison 19'	AVFC; BBC	Holman 21'; Weimann 79', 85'; Benteke 90+1'	Stadium: Carrow Road; Attendance: 26,142; Referee: Michael Oliver

8 January 2013 Semi-finals; First Leg	Bradford City	3–1	Aston Villa	Bradford
19:45 UTC±0	Wells 19'; McArdle 77'; McHugh 88', (yellow card) 89'	AVFC; BBC	N'Zogbia (yellow card) 61'; Delph (yellow card) 78'; Weimann 82'	Stadium: Valley Parade; Attendance: 22,245; Referee: Howard Webb

22 January 2013 Semi-finals; Second Leg	Aston Villa	2–1 (3–4 agg.)	Bradford City	Birmingham
19:45 UTC±0	Clark (yellow card) 22'; Benteke 23'; N'Zogbia (yellow card) 83'; Weimann 89'; Delph (yellow card) 90+2'	AVFC; BBC	Hanson 55'	Stadium: Villa Park; Attendance: 40,193; Referee: Phil Dowd
