= Matt Lowton =

English footballer (born 1989)

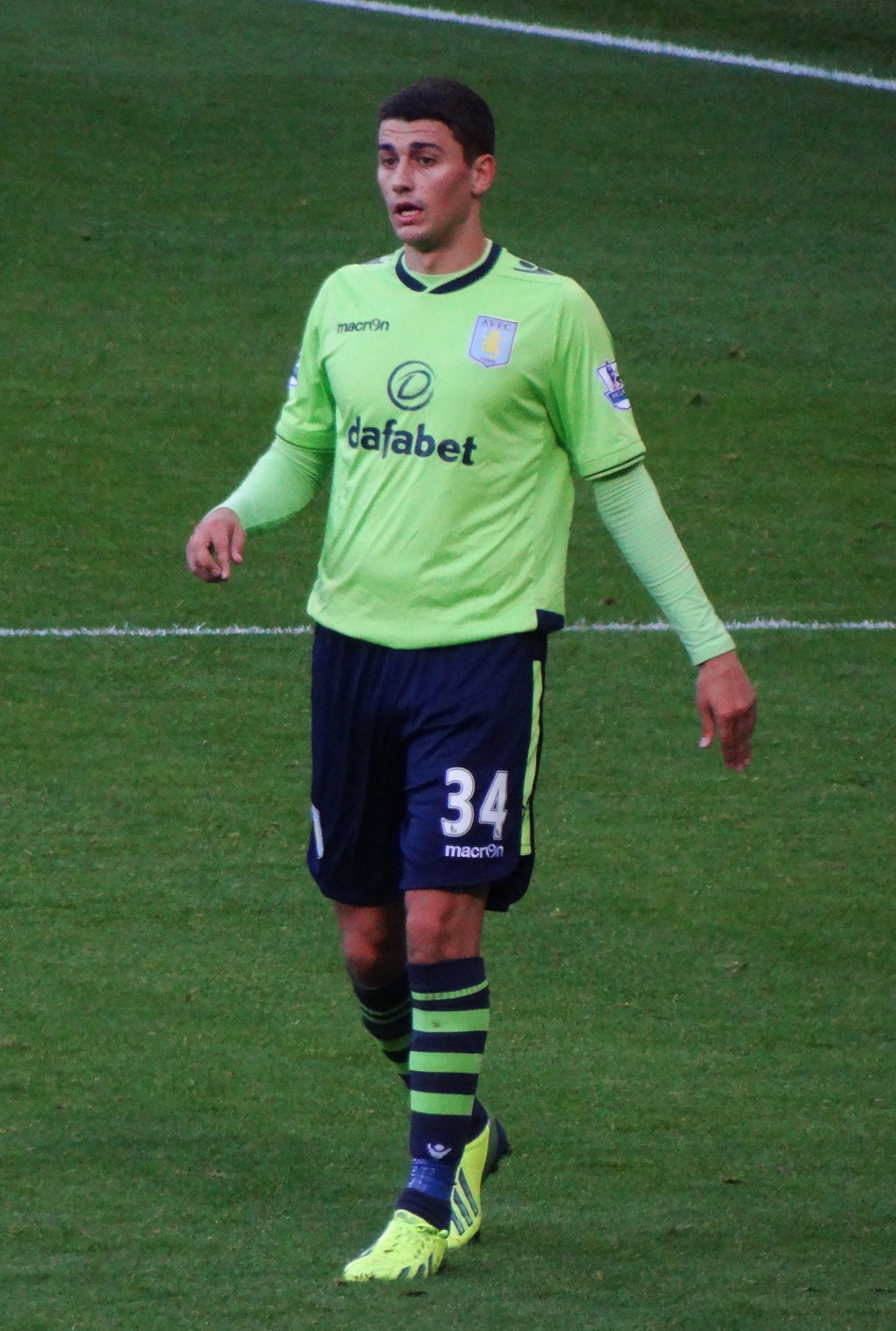
- Lowton playing for Aston Villa in 2013

Personal information
- Full name: Matthew John Lowton
- Date of birth: 9 June 1989 (age 37)
- Place of birth: Chesterfield, England
- Height: 5 ft 11 in (1.80 m)
- Position: Right back

Team information
- Current team: Phoenix United (assistant manager)

Youth career
- 1999–2004: Leeds United
- 2004–2007: Sheffield United

Senior career*
Years	Team	Apps	(Gls)
2007–2012	Sheffield United	78	(10)
2008	→ Sheffield (loan)	17	(0)
2009	→ Ferencváros (loan)	16	(0)
2009	→ Ferencváros II (loan)	4	(3)
2012–2015	Aston Villa	72	(2)
2015–2023	Burnley	186	(3)
2023	→ Huddersfield Town (loan)	8	(0)
2023–2024	Witton Albion	26	(4)
2024–2025	Precision	21	(4)
Total		428	(26)
- * Club domestic league appearances and goals as of 08:05, 2 May 2025 (UTC)

Matthew John Lowton (born 9 June 1989) is an English former professional footballer who played as a right back. He is currently assistant manager of UAE Third Division League club Phoenix United.

Lowton joined Sheffield United's academy in 2004. He spent time on loan with both non-league Sheffield and Hungarian side Ferencváros before making the break into United's first team in 2010. He played regularly for two seasons before being sold to Aston Villa in 2012. After three seasons and 72 Premier League appearances, he joined Burnley in 2015.

== Career ==
=== Sheffield United ===
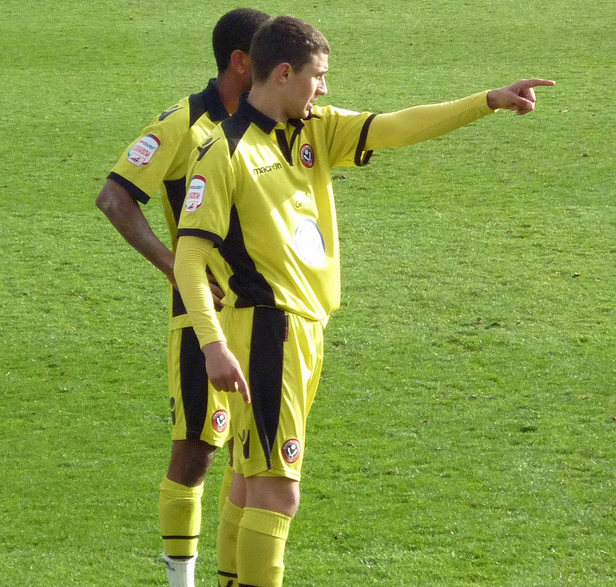
Lowton playing for Sheffield United in 2011

Lowton was born in Chesterfield, Derbyshire. He joined Sheffield United aged fifteen after a spell with Leeds United and progressed through Sheffield United's youth set up to reserve level, converting from a full-back to a central defensive role in the process. After spending a spell on loan at Sheffield FC in 2008, in January 2009, Lowton went out on loan to Sheffield United's Hungarian sister club Ferencváros, along with fellow reserve player Sam Wedgbury, to get first-team experience. He made his debut in the Hungarian League Cup the next month, making twenty appearances for the club.

Back in the Championship, Lowton found himself on the fringes of the first team and duly made his Blades debut in a 1–1 draw with Cardiff City at the end of March 2010, coming on as a late substitute, before making his full debut for the club in the final match of the season.

The following season, Lowton started Sheffield United's opening day fixture, away to Cardiff City, but was issued with a straight red card. Despite this setback, he returned to the first-team picture and was rewarded with a new contract at the end of September. Lowton continued a run of substitute appearances and rewarded United's faith by scoring his first senior goal in mid-October, netting in a 3–3 home draw with Burnley. Lowton played regularly for the remainder of the season, scoring four goals in all, but couldn't prevent the club from slipping to relegation.

With the Blades in League One at the time, Lowton remained a key player and was rewarded with an extended contract in August 2011, making 55 appearances in total for the Blades during the following season and scoring six goals.

=== Aston Villa ===
Lowton completed a move to Aston Villa in July 2012 for an undisclosed fee, believed to be £3 million, becoming Paul Lambert's second signing as Villa manager, and made his debut on 18 August 2012, in the Premier League against West Ham United. On 15 September, Lowton scored his first league goal for Villa in a 2–0 home win against Swansea City. On 19 July 2013, Lowton signed a new four-year deal to keep him at Aston Villa until the summer of 2017.

=== Burnley ===
On 22 June 2015, Burnley secured the signing of Lowton on a three-year deal for an undisclosed fee believed to be around £1 million plus add-ons. Lowton made his debut for Burnley on 20 October, as an 84th-minute substitute against Nottingham Forest; his first start came against Charlton Athletic on 19 December. His first and only goal of the season was Burnley's fourth in a 5–0 rout of Milton Keynes Dons on 12 January 2016. Lowton would make 27 appearances in his maiden season at Burnley, all in the League, as Burnley won the Championship title and earned promotion to the Premier League.

==== Huddersfield Town (loan) ====
On 4 January 2023, Lowton joined fellow EFL Championship side Huddersfield Town on loan for the remainder of the 2022–23 season.

=== Witton Albion ===
On 6 November 2023, Lowton signed for Northern Premier League Division One West club Witton Albion.

=== Precision Football ===
In September 2024, Lowton joined UAE Second Division League club Precision Football.

== Coaching career ==
On 29 July 2026, Lowton was appointed assistant manager of UAE Third Division League club Phoenix United following their admission to the league, assisting Jamie Ward.

== Other ventures ==
Lowton was an investor in the clothing company Seven One Zero, which was founded by fellow footballers Gavin Rae, Curtis Davies and Chris Burke. The company was voluntarily dissolved in 2018.

== Career statistics ==
As of end of 2023–24 season

Appearances and goals by club, season and competition
Club	Season	League			National Cup		League Cup		Other		Total	
Club	Season	Division	Apps	Goals	Apps	Goals	Apps	Goals	Apps	Goals	Apps	Goals
Sheffield United	2009–10	Championship	2	0	0	0	0	0	—		2	0
Sheffield United	2010–11	Championship	32	4	0	0	0	0	—		32	4
Sheffield United	2011–12	League One	44	6	3	0	2	0	6 (Note: Three appearances in Football League Trophy, three in League One play-offs)	0	55	6
Sheffield United	Total		78	10	3	0	2	0	6	0	89	10
Sheffield (loan)	2007–08	NPL Division One South	17	0	—		—		5 (Note: Three appearances in Sheffield & Hallamshire Senior Cup, two in Northern Premier League Division One South play-offs)	0	22	0
Ferencváros (loan)	2008–09	Nemzeti Bajnokság II	11	0	—		2	0	—		13	0
Ferencváros (loan)	2009–10	Nemzeti Bajnokság I	5	0	0	0	2	0	—		7	0
Ferencváros (loan)	Total		16	0	0	0	4	0	—		20	0
Ferencváros II (loan)	2009–10	Nemzeti Bajnokság III	4	3	—		—		—		4	3
Aston Villa	2012–13	Premier League	37	2	1	0	6	0	—		44	2
Aston Villa	2013–14	Premier League	23	0	1	0	1	0	—		25	0
Aston Villa	2014–15	Premier League	12	0	1	0	0	0	—		13	0
Aston Villa	Total		72	2	3	0	7	0	—		82	2
Burnley	2015–16	Championship	27	1	0	0	0	0	—		27	1
Burnley	2016–17	Premier League	36	0	0	0	0	0	—		36	0
Burnley	2017–18	Premier League	26	0	1	0	0	0	—		27	0
Burnley	2018–19	Premier League	21	0	0	0	1	0	2 (Note: Appearances in UEFA Europa League)	0	24	0
Burnley	2019–20	Premier League	17	0	2	0	1	0	—		20	0
Burnley	2020–21	Premier League	34	1	3	0	3	0	—		40	1
Burnley	2021–22	Premier League	25	1	1	0	1	0	—		27	1
Burnley	2022–23	Championship	0	0	—		2	0	—		2	0
Burnley	Total		186	3	7	0	8	0	2	0	203	3
Huddersfield Town (loan)	2022–23	Championship	8	0	1	0	—		—		9	0
Witton Albion	2023–24	NPL Division One West	26	4	0	0	—		1 (Note: Appearance(s) in Mid Cheshire Senior Cup)	0	27	4
Career total			407	22	14	0	21	0	14	0	456	22

== Honours ==
Burnley

- Football League Championship: 2015–16
