= 2011–12 Aston Villa F.C. season =

English football club season

Aston Villa
2011–12 season
- Chairman: Randy Lerner
- Manager: Alex McLeish
- Stadium: Villa Park
- Premier League: 16th
- FA Cup: Fourth round
- League Cup: Third round
- Top goalscorer: League: Darren Bent (9); All: Darren Bent (10)
- Highest home attendance: 40,053 v Manchester United (3 December 2011)
- Lowest home attendance: 21,058 v Hereford United (23 August 2011)
- Average home league attendance: 32,643
Home colours	Away colours

The 2011-12 season was Aston Villa's 20th season in the Premier League. The 2011–12 Premier League season was Villa's 137th season in English football. It was the club's 101st season in the top-flight; and their 24th consecutive season in the top flight of English football, the Premier League. The club was managed by former Birmingham boss Alex McLeish, following Gérard Houllier's departure on 1 June 2011 after less than a year in charge. An extremely disappointing season for the club, saw them finish in 16th place and only two points off relegation. Numerous records were broken during the season including: the lowest points total in the Premier League (38 from 38 games), fewest wins in a season (7) and worst home record in Villa's 138-year history (19 points from 57 available). As well as poor performances in both domestic cups – being knocked out in the third round of the League Cup and the fourth round of the FA Cup – this season eventually culminated in the sacking of McLeish on 14 May 2012, a day after the season had concluded.

As Villa finished 9th in the previous season, this term was the first since 2007–08 without the club participating in European competition. There was also no Second City derby in the Premier League as local arch-rivals Birmingham City were relegated to the Football League Championship at the end of the 2010–11 season. Derbies with Villa's other West Midlands rivals West Bromwich Albion and Wolverhampton Wanderers were played in the Premier League.

During the season club captain Stiliyan Petrov was diagnosed with acute leukaemia. The news was a shock to the Villa faithful and the footballing world alike; clubs all around the world have united donning T-shirts with Petrov's name and words of support written across them. The game on 31 March 2012 against Chelsea was the first game played since the diagnosis and fans of both teams gave him a standing ovation in the 19th minute, the significance being Petrov's squad number is 19. He was at the game with his wife and two children, and you could see the emotion of the event was getting to him as he acknowledged the fans.

An under-19 Aston Villa team also took part in the inaugural season of the NextGen Series, a tournament similar to the UEFA Champions League for young European footballers to compete in. The team reached the Quarter-finals, before being knocked out by Marseille.

== Kit ==
Supplier: Nike / Sponsor: Genting Casinos

Home	Alt. Home	Away	Alt. Away	Goalkeeper 1	Goalkeeper 2	Goalkeeper 3

The home kit featured a subtle checkerboard print on the shirt and was very worn with black socks, last seen between the mid-1920s and 1957. The away kit was unsurprisingly white with claret shorts and white socks – and had the same design as the home kit. Claret and sky blue shorts/socks were worn in several away games to prevent kit mix-ups. The three goalkeeper kits were blue, black, and grey and were based on Nike's 2011 template which featured stunning details on the sleeves and the side of the shirt.

== Premier League ==
Pos	Team	Pld	W	D	L	GF	GA	GD	Pts	Qualification or relegation
14	Stoke City	38	11	12	15	36	53	−17	45	
15	Wigan Athletic	38	11	10	17	42	62	−20	43	
16	Aston Villa	38	7	17	14	37	53	−16	38	
17	Queens Park Rangers	38	10	7	21	43	66	−23	37	
18	Bolton Wanderers (R)	38	10	6	22	46	77	−31	36	Relegation to Football League Championship

Source: Barclays Premier League
Rules for classification: 1) points; 2) goal difference; 3) number of goals scored.
(R) Relegated

=== Matches ===
13 August 2011 1	Fulham	0–0	Aston Villa	London
15:00 UTC±0		Report		Stadium: Craven Cottage; Attendance: 25,700; Referee: Lee Mason

20 August 2011 2	Aston Villa	3–1	Blackburn Rovers	Birmingham
15:00 UTC±0	Agbonlahor 12'; Heskey 25' (yellow card) 55'; Delph (yellow card) 58'; Bent 67'; Petrov (yellow card) 80'	Report	Pedersen 52'	Stadium: Villa Park; Attendance: 32,319; Referee: Stuart Attwell

27 August 2011 3	Aston Villa	0–0	Wolverhampton Wanderers	Birmingham
12:05 UTC±0	Delph (yellow card) 6'	Report	O'Hara (yellow card) 45+1'; Henry (yellow card) 63'; Stearman (yellow card) 72'	Stadium: Villa Park; Attendance: 30,776; Referee: Martin Atkinson

10 September 2011 4	Everton	2–2	Aston Villa	Liverpool
15:00 UTC±0	Osman 19'; Baines 69' (pen.)	Report	Petrov 63'; Agbonlahor 83'	Stadium: Goodison Park; Attendance: 32,736; Referee: Michael Oliver

17 September 2011 5	Aston Villa	1–1	Newcastle United	Birmingham
15:00 UTC±0	Agbonlahor 13'	Report	Best 57'	Stadium: Villa Park; Attendance: 34,248; Referee: Neil Swarbrick

25 September 2011 6	Queens Park Rangers	1–1	Aston Villa	London
15:00 UTC±0	Dunne 90+3' (o.g.); Traoré (red card) 90'	Report	Bannan 58' (pen.)	Stadium: Loftus Road; Attendance: 16,707; Referee: Michael Oliver

1 October 2011 7	Aston Villa	2–0	Wigan Athletic	Birmingham
15:00 UTC±0	Agbonlahor 36'; Bent 62'	Report		Stadium: Villa Park; Attendance: 30,744; Referee: Mark Clattenburg

15 October 2011 8	Manchester City	4–1	Aston Villa	Manchester
15:00 UTC±0	Balotelli 28'; Johnson 47'; Kompany 52'; Milner 71'	Report	Warnock 65'	Stadium: Etihad Stadium; Attendance: 47,019; Referee: Anthony Taylor

22 October 2011 9	Aston Villa	1–2	West Bromwich Albion	Birmingham
15:00 UTC±0	Bent 23' (pen.); Herd (red card) 36'	Report	Olsson 45+1'; Scharner 57'	Stadium: Villa Park; Attendance: 34,152; Referee: Phil Dowd

29 October 2011 10	Sunderland	2–2	Aston Villa	Sunderland
15:00 UTC±0	Wickham 38'; Sessègnon 89'	Report	Petrov 20'; Dunne 85'	Stadium: Stadium of Light; Referee: Chris Foy

5 November 2011 11	Aston Villa	3–2	Norwich City	Birmingham
15:00 UTC±0	Bent 30', 62'; Agbonlahor 48'	Report	Pilkington 25'; Morison 77'	Stadium: Villa Park; Attendance: 35,290; Referee: Kevin Friend

21 November 2011 12	Tottenham Hotspur	2–0	Aston Villa	London
20:00 UTC±0	Adebayor 14', 40'	Report		Stadium: White Hart Lane; Attendance: 35,818; Referee: Mark Halsey

27 November 2011 13	Swansea City	0–0	Aston Villa	Swansea
13:30 UTC±0		Report		Stadium: Liberty Stadium; Attendance: 20,404; Referee: Neil Swarbrick

3 December 2011 14	Aston Villa	0–1	Manchester United	Birmingham
17:30 UTC±0		Report	Jones 20'	Stadium: Villa Park; Attendance: 40,053; Referee: Lee Probert

10 December 2011 15	Bolton Wanderers	1–2	Aston Villa	Bolton
15:00 UTC±0	Klasnić 55'	Report	Albrighton 33'; Petrov 39'	Stadium: Reebok Stadium; Attendance: 20,285; Referee: Phil Dowd

18 December 2011 16	Aston Villa	0–2	Liverpool	Birmingham
14:05 UTC±0	N'Zogbia (yellow card) 13'	Report	Bellamy 11' (yellow card) 30'; Škrtel 15'; Adam (yellow card) 28'	Stadium: Villa Park; Attendance: 37,460; Referee: Peter Walton

21 December 2011 17	Aston Villa	1–2	Arsenal	Birmingham
19:45 UTC±0	Albrighton 54'; Hutton (red card) 94'	Report	Van Persie 17' (pen.); Benayoun 87'	Stadium: Villa Park; Attendance: 35,818; Referee: Jonathan Moss

26 December 2011 18	Stoke City	0–0	Aston Villa	Stoke-on-Trent
20:00 UTC±0		Report		Stadium: Britannia Stadium; Attendance: 27,739; Referee: Mark Clattenburg

31 December 2011 19	Chelsea	1–3	Aston Villa	London
15:00 UTC±0	Drogba 23' (pen.)	Report	Ireland 28'; Petrov 83'; Bent 86'	Stadium: Stamford Bridge; Attendance: 41,332; Referee: Mark Halsey

2 January 2012 20	Aston Villa	0–2	Swansea City	Birmingham
15:00 UTC±0		Report	Dyer 5'; Routledge 47'	Stadium: Villa Park; Attendance: 35,642; Referee: Anthony Taylor

14 January 2012 21	Aston Villa	1–1	Everton	Birmingham
15:00 UTC±0	Bent 56'	Report	Anichebe 69'	Stadium: Villa Park; Attendance: 31,853; Referee: Mark Clattenburg

21 January 2012 22	Wolverhampton Wanderers	2–3	Aston Villa	Wolverhampton
15:00 UTC±0	Kightly 21'; Edwards 31'; Henry (red card) 75'	Report	Bent 11' (pen.); Keane 51', 84'	Stadium: Molineux Stadium; Attendance: 27,084; Referee: Michael Oliver

1 February 2012 23	Aston Villa	2–2	Queens Park Rangers	Birmingham
19:45 UTC±0	Bent 45'; N'Zogbia 79'	Report	Cissé 12'; Warnock 29' (o.g.)	Stadium: Villa Park; Attendance: 32,063; Referee: Neil Swarbrick

5 February 2012 24	Newcastle United	2–1	Aston Villa	Newcastle
13:30 UTC±0	Ba 30'; Cissé 71'	Report	Keane 45+5'	Stadium: St James' Park; Attendance: 48,569; Referee: Mark Halsey

11 February 2012 25	Aston Villa	0–1	Manchester City	Birmingham
15:00 UTC±0		Report	Lescott 63'	Stadium: Villa Park; Attendance: 35,152; Referee: Michael Oliver

25 February 2012 26	Wigan Athletic	0–0	Aston Villa	Wigan
15:00 UTC±0		Report		Stadium: DW Stadium; Attendance: 20,601; Referee: Kevin Friend

3 March 2012 27	Blackburn Rovers	1–1	Aston Villa	Blackburn
15:00 UTC±0	Dunn 85'	Report	N'Zogbia 24'	Stadium: Ewood Park; Attendance: 20,717; Referee: Howard Webb

10 March 2012 28	Aston Villa	1–0	Fulham	Birmingham
15:00 UTC±0	Weimann 90+2'	Report		Stadium: Villa Park; Attendance: 32,372; Referee: Jonathan Moss

20 March 2012	Aston Villa	P – P	Bolton Wanderers	Birmingham
15:00 UTC±0				Stadium: Villa Park
Note: Postponed until 24 April, at Bolton's request, after Fabrice Muamba suffered a cardiac arrest on 17 March.

24 March 2012 29	Arsenal	3–0	Aston Villa	London
15:00 UTC±0	Gibbs 16'; Walcott 25'; Arteta 90+3'	Report	Petrov (yellow card) 15'; Warnock (yellow card) 52'; Ireland (yellow card) 70'; Collins (yellow card) 89'	Stadium: Emirates Stadium; Attendance: 60,108; Referee: Phil Dowd

31 March 2012 30	Aston Villa	2–4	Chelsea	Birmingham
15:00 UTC±0	Collins 76'; Lichaj 80'	Report	Sturridge 9'; Ivanović 51', 83'; Torres 90+2'	Stadium: Villa Park; Attendance: 34,740; Referee: Lee Mason

7 April 2012 31	Liverpool	1–1	Aston Villa	Liverpool
15:00 UTC±0	Suárez 82'	Report	Herd 10'	Stadium: Anfield; Attendance: 44,321; Referee: Michael Oliver

9 April 2012 32	Aston Villa	1–1	Stoke City	Birmingham
17:30 UTC±0	Weimann 32'	Report	Huth 71'	Stadium: Villa Park; Attendance: 30,100; Referee: Mike Dean

14 April 2012 33	Manchester United	4–0	Aston Villa	Manchester
15:00 UTC±0	Rooney 7' (pen.), 73'; Welbeck 44'; Nani 90+3'	Report		Stadium: Old Trafford; Attendance: 75,138; Referee: Mark Halsey

21 April 2012 34	Aston Villa	0–0	Sunderland	Birmingham
15:00 UTC±0		Report	Gardner (yellow card) 49' (red card) 90+2'; Bendtner (yellow card) 67'	Stadium: Villa Park; Attendance: 32,557; Referee: Anthony Taylor

24 April 2012 35	Aston Villa	1–2	Bolton Wanderers	Birmingham
19:45 UTC±0	Warnock 60'	Report	Petrov 62' (pen.); Ngog 63'	Stadium: Villa Park; Attendance: 32,263; Referee: Chris Foy

28 April 2012 36	West Bromwich Albion	0–0	Aston Villa	West Bromwich
15:00 UTC±0		Report		Stadium: The Hawthorns; Attendance: 25,984; Referee: Mark Clattenburg

5 May 2012 37	Aston Villa	1–1	Tottenham Hotspur	Birmingham
15:00 UTC±0	Clark 35'	Report	Adebayor 63' (pen.)	Stadium: Villa Park; Attendance: 36,008; Referee: Lee Probert

13 May 2012 38	Norwich City	2–0	Aston Villa	Norwich
15:00 UTC±0	Holt 8'; Jackson 21'	Report		Stadium: Carrow Road; Attendance: 26,803; Referee: Martin Atkinson

=== League results summary ===
Overall								Home						Away					
Pld	W	D	L	GF	GA	GD	Pts	W	D	L	GF	GA	GD	W	D	L	GF	GA	GD
38	7	17	14	37	53	−16	38	4	7	8	20	25	−5	3	10	6	17	28	−11

Last updated: 13 May 2012.
Source: Competitive matches

Match	1	2	3	4	5	6	7	8	9	10	11	12	13	14	15	16	17	18	19	20	21	22	23	24	25	26	27	28	29	30	31	32	33	34	35	36	37	38
Ground	A	H	H	A	H	A	H	A	H	A	H	A	A	H	A	H	H	A	A	H	H	A	H	A	H	A	A	H	A	H	A	H	A	H	H	A	H	A
Result	D	W	D	D	D	D	W	L	L	D	W	L	D	L	W	L	L	D	W	L	D	W	D	L	L	D	D	W	L	L	D	D	L	D	L	D	D	L
Position	7	1	6	8	8	8	6	8	11	9	8	8	8	9	8	10	12	12	9	13	13	11	12	13	15	15	15	14	15	15	15	15	15	15	15	15	15	16

Updated to match(es) played on 13 May 2012. Source: premierleague.com
A = Away; H = Home; W = Win; D = Draw; L = Loss

== FA Cup ==
7 January 2012 3rd Round	Bristol Rovers	1–3	Aston Villa	Bristol
17:30	McGleish 90'	Report	Albrighton 35'; Agbonlahor 64'; Clark 78'	Stadium: Memorial Stadium; Attendance: 10,883; Referee: Howard Webb

29 January 2012 4th Round	Arsenal	3–2	Aston Villa	London
16:00	Van Persie 54' (pen.), 61' (pen.); Walcott 57'	Report	Dunne 33'; Bent 45+1'	Stadium: Emirates Stadium; Attendance: 60,019; Referee: Mike Jones

== League Cup ==
23 August 2011 2nd Round	Aston Villa	2–0	Hereford United	Birmingham
19:45	Lichaj 80'; Delfouneso 88'	Report		Stadium: Villa Park; Attendance: 21,058

20 September 2011 3rd Round	Aston Villa	0–2	Bolton Wanderers	Birmingham
19:45		Report	Eagles 54'; Kakuta 77'	Stadium: Villa Park; Attendance: 22,261

== Pre-season ==
Win Draw Loss Postponed

21 July 2011	Walsall	1–3	Aston Villa	Walsall
19:45 UTC±0	Bowerman 80'	Report	Bent 8', 36'; Heskey 38'	Stadium: Banks's Stadium; Attendance: 7,170

3 August 2011	Derby County	2–0	Aston Villa	Derby
19:45 UTC±0	B. Davies 56' (pen.); S. Davies 77'	Report		Stadium: Pride Park Stadium; Attendance: 8,974

6 August 2011	Braga (Portugal)	1–1	Aston Villa	Braga
	Alan 18'	Report	N'Zogbia 39'	Stadium: Estádio AXA

=== Premier League Asia Trophy ===
27 July 2011 Semi-final	Aston Villa	1–0	Blackburn Rovers	Hong Kong
18:00 UTC+8	Bent 49'	Report		Stadium: Hong Kong Stadium; Attendance: 37,000; Referee: Ng Chiuh Kok

30 July 2011 Final	Aston Villa	0–2	Chelsea	Hong Kong
18:00 UTC+8		Report	McEachran 1'; Torres 59'	Stadium: Hong Kong Stadium; Attendance: 38,911; Referee: Mike Dean

== Players ==
=== Squad ===
In the 2010–11 season the Premier League introduced new rules on squad lists. The rules included a cap on the number of players at 25; players under the age of 21 on 1 January of the year in which the season starts are exempt from the list of 25. A "home-grown rule" also requires clubs to name at least eight players in their squad of 25 players that have been registered domestically for a minimum of three seasons prior to their 21st birthday.

Players under 21 do not need to be named and can still be used.
Correct as of 12 January 2012. Note: Flags indicate national team as defined under FIFA eligibility rules; some limited exceptions apply. Players may hold more than one non-FIFA nationality.

No.	Pos.	Nation	Player
1	GK	IRL	Shay Given
2	DF	SCO	Alan Hutton
3	DF	ENG	Stephen Warnock
5	DF	IRL	Richard Dunne (vice-captain)
6	DF	WAL	James Collins
7	MF	IRL	Stephen Ireland
9	FW	ENG	Darren Bent
10	MF	FRA	Charles N'Zogbia
11	FW	ENG	Gabriel Agbonlahor (temporary captain)^{1}
12	MF	ENG	Marc Albrighton
14	FW	ENG	Nathan Delfouneso
16	MF	ENG	Fabian Delph
17	MF	CMR	Jean Makoun
18	FW	ENG	Emile Heskey
19	MF	BUL	Stiliyan Petrov (captain)

No.	Pos.	Nation	Player
21	DF	IRL	Ciaran Clark
22	GK	USA	Brad Guzan
24	DF	ESP	Carlos Cuéllar
25	MF	SCO	Barry Bannan
26	FW	AUT	Andreas Weimann
29	DF	IRL	Enda Stevens
30	DF	USA	Eric Lichaj
31	MF	AUS	Chris Herd
32	DF	ENG	Nathan Baker
33	GK	ENG	Andy Marshall
35	MF	JAM	Daniel Johnson
36	FW	IRL	Graham Burke
37	DF	IRL	Derrick Williams
38	MF	ENG	Gary Gardner
40	MF	IRL	Samir Carruthers
41	MF	ENG	Jack Grealish

- ^{1} Stiliyan Petrov was the club's permanent captain, but Gabriel Agbonlahor was named temporary captain while Petrov underwent treatment for acute leukemia.

==== Left club during season ====
These players were given squad numbers at the beginning of the 2011-12 season before transferring to another club for all or part of the season.

Note: Flags indicate national team as defined under FIFA eligibility rules; some limited exceptions apply. Players may hold more than one non-FIFA nationality.

No.	Pos.	Nation	Player
2	DF	ENG	Luke Young (transferred to Queens Park Rangers during the season)
8	MF	ENG	Jermaine Jenas (on loan for part of season but returned to Tottenham Hotspur during the season)
14	FW	ENG	Nathan Delfouneso (on loan at Leicester City during the season)
16	MF	ENG	Fabian Delph (on loan at Leeds United during the season)
17	MF	CMR	Jean Makoun (on loan at Olympiacos)
20	FW	IRL	Robbie Keane (on loan from Los Angeles Galaxy during the season)
23	DF	SEN	Habib Beye (on loan at Doncaster Rovers during the season before being released in February)

No.	Pos.	Nation	Player
26	FW	AUT	Andreas Weimann (on loan at Watford during the season)
28	MF	ENG	Jonathan Hogg (transferred to Watford during the season)
32	DF	ENG	Nathan Baker (on loan at Millwall during the season)
34	DF	AUS	Shane Lowry (on loan at Millwall during the season before joining permanently in January)
38	MF	ENG	Gary Gardner (on loan at Coventry City during the season)
43	GK	ENG	Elliot Parish (on loan at Cardiff City during the season before joining permanently in January)

== Squad numbers ==
Following the exit of Ashley Young to Manchester United, Stephen Ireland was given the #7 which was held by the former winger. With Ireland having worn the #9 shirt last season, him taking the #7 allowed Darren Bent to wear the #9 this season. Also, after Stewart Downing's departure to Liverpool, James Collins took over the #6 meaning his old #29 shirt could be given to January signing Enda Stevens.

New signings goalkeeper Shay Given from Manchester City and ex-Wigan winger Charles N'Zogbia were given the #1 (vacated by the departed Brad Friedel) and #10 (vacated by the departed John Carew) shirts, respectively.

Deadline day capture Alan Hutton, took the #2 shirt left free after Luke Young's transfer to Queens Park Rangers and loan signing Jermaine Jenas had been given the #8 shirt for the season, last worn by Robert Pires. It was again vacated, however, when Jenas returned to Tottenham Hotspur in December.

Young striker Graham Burke was added to the first-team squad ahead of the League Cup tie against Bolton Wanderers on 20 September, being handed the #36 shirt.

January loan signing Robbie Keane was given the #20 shirt for his short spell at Villa, left vacated since Nigel Reo-Coker's summer departure

Youngsters Derrick Williams, Samir Carruthers and Jack Grealish were also given squad numbers (#37, #40, #41, respectively) at different points during the season, when called up for first team action.

== Sponsorship ==
Aston Villa had a new club sponsor for this season, after the deal with previous partner FxPro was terminated in February 2011. On 22 June 2011, Aston Villa announced via their official website that the club's new sponsor until the end of the 2012–13 season would be Malaysian-based Genting Casinos.

== Managerial changes ==
Manager Gérard Houllier missed the final five games of Villa's 2010–11 campaign due to health issues. He had previously faced similar problems during his time at Liverpool.

On 1 June 2011, the club confirmed that Houllier had parted ways with the club by mutual consent due to the Frenchman's ill health.

He was replaced by Scottish former Birmingham City manager Alex McLeish on 17 June 2011, despite protests from some Villa fans outside Villa Park.

Date	Outgoing Manager	New Club	Incoming Manager	Previous Team	Notes
17 June 2011	(France) Gérard Houllier	(Europe) Unattached	(Scotland) Alex McLeish	(England) Birmingham City	Villa paid £2 million compensation for McLeish's services.

== Transfers ==
=== In ===
Summer

Date	Position	Player name	Previous club	League	Transfer fee	Notes
18 July 2011	GK	(Republic of Ireland) Shay Given	(England) Manchester City	(England) Premier League	£3.5m	
29 July 2011	MF	(France) Charles N'Zogbia	(England) Wigan Athletic	(England) Premier League	£9.5m	
31 August 2011	DF	(Scotland) Alan Hutton	(England) Tottenham Hotspur	(England) Premier League	£3m	

Winter

Date	Position	Player name	Previous club	League	Transfer fee	Notes
1 January 2012	DF	(Republic of Ireland) Enda Stevens	(Republic of Ireland) Shamrock Rovers	(Republic of Ireland) League of Ireland Premier Division	£250,000	Transfer was announced on 31 August, with player joining in January 2012

=== Out ===
Summer

Date	Position	Player name	New club	League	Transfer fee	Notes
27 May 2011	MF	(England) Nigel Reo-Coker	(England) Bolton Wanderers	(England) Premier League	Released	Joined Bolton Wanderers following release from Villa
27 May 2011	FW	(Norway) John Carew	(England) West Ham United	(England) Championship	Released	Joined West Ham United following release from Villa
27 May 2011	MF	(England) Isaiah Osbourne	(Scotland) Hibernian	(Scotland) Scottish Premier League	Released	Joined Hibernian following release from Villa
27 May 2011	MF	(Togo) Moustapha Salifou	(Germany) Saarbrücken	(Germany) 3. Liga	Released	Joined Saarbrücken following release from Villa
27 May 2011	MF	(France) Robert Pires	(Europe) Unattached		Released	
27 May 2011	MF	(England) Harry Forrester	(England) Brentford	(England) League 1	Released	Youth player; joined Brentford following release from Villa
27 May 2011	DF/FW	(Netherlands) Arsenio Halfhuid	(Netherlands) HBS Craeyenhout	(Netherlands) Topklasse Sunday	Released	Youth player; joined HBS following release from Villa
27 May 2011	DF	(England) Durrell Berry	(England) Plymouth Argyle	(England) League 2	Released	Youth player; joined Plymouth Argyle following release from Villa
27 May 2011	DF	(England) Ellis Deeney	(England) Kettering Town	(England) Conference National	Released	Youth player; joined Kettering Town following release from Villa
27 May 2011	DF	(England) Calum Flanagan	(England) Hinckley United	(England) Conference North	Released	Youth player; joined Hinckley United following release from Villa
3 June 2011	GK	(United States) Brad Friedel	(England) Tottenham Hotspur	(England) Premier League	Free Transfer	
23 June 2011	MF	(England) Ashley Young	(England) Manchester United	(England) Premier League	£17m	
15 July 2011	MF	(England) Stewart Downing	(England) Liverpool	(England) Premier League	£20m	
27 August 2011	MF	(England) Jonathan Hogg	(England) Watford	(England) Championship	Undisclosed	
27 August 2011	DF	(England) Luke Young	(England) Queens Park Rangers	(England) Premier League	Undisclosed	

Winter

Date	Position	Player name	New club	League	Transfer fee	Notes
3 January 2012	GK	(England) Elliot Parish	(Wales) Cardiff City	(England) Championship	Undisclosed	
27 January 2012	DF	(Australia) Shane Lowry	(England) Millwall	(England) Championship	Undisclosed	
2 February 2012	DF	(Senegal) Habib Beye	(England) Doncaster Rovers	(England) Championship	Released	Contract was cancelled by mutual consent. Joined Doncaster Rovers following release from Villa.

=== Loans ===
==== In ====
Summer

Date	Position	Player name	Previous club	League	Duration	Return Date	Notes
31 August 2011	MF	(England) Jermaine Jenas	(England) Tottenham Hotspur	(England) Premier League	4 months	December 2011	Initially season-long, the loan was ended early after Jenas was ruled out for the rest of the season with an achilles injury

Winter

Date	Position	Player name	Previous club	League	Duration	Return Date	Notes
12 January 2012	FW	(Republic of Ireland) Robbie Keane	(United States) Los Angeles Galaxy	(United States) MLS	1.5 months	25 February 2012	

==== Out ====
Summer

Date	Position	Player name	New club	League	Duration	Return Date	Notes
26 August 2011	FW	(Austria) Andreas Weimann	(England) Watford	(England) Championship	1 month	23 September 2011	Initially a 5-month loan but Villa recalled player in late September.
29 August 2011	MF	(Cameroon) Jean Makoun	(Greece) Olymipacos	(Greece) Super League	Season-long	June 2012	
24 September 2011	GK	(England) Elliot Parish	(Wales) Cardiff City	(England) Championship	2 months	10 November 2011	

Winter

Date	Position	Player name	New club	League	Duration	Return Date	Notes
21 November 2011	DF	(Senegal) Habib Beye	(England) Doncaster Rovers	(England) Championship	2 months	January 2012	
22 November 2011	DF	(England) Nathan Baker	(England) Millwall	(England) Championship	1 month	December 2011	
23 November 2011	DF	(Australia) Shane Lowry	(England) Millwall	(England) Championship	1 month	2 January 2012	
24 November 2011	MF	(England) Gary Gardner	(England) Coventry City	(England) Championship	1 month	21 December 2012	Initially a loan until January but Villa recalled player in late December.
3 January 2012	DF	(Australia) Shane Lowry	(England) Millwall	(England) Championship	1 month	January 2012	
20 January 2012	MF	(England) Fabian Delph	(England) Leeds United	(England) Championship	1 month	20 February 2012	
23 January 2012	FW	(England) Nathan Delfouneso	(England) Leicester City	(England) Championship	1 month	February 2012	

== Statistics ==
=== Appearances ===
Number	Nation	Position	Name	Premier League		FA Cup		League Cup		Total		Notes	
Number	Nation	Position	Name	Start	Sub	Start	Sub	Start	Sub	Start	Sub		
1	(Republic of Ireland)	GK	Given	32	—	1	—	1	—	33	0		
22	(United States)	GK	Guzan	6	1	1	—	1	—	8	1		
2	(England)	DF	Young	2	—	—	—	—	—	2	0	(Note: Left for Queens Park Rangers on 27 August 2011)	
23	(Senegal)	DF	Beye	—	—	—	—	—	1	0	1	(Note: Loaned out until January to Doncaster Rovers on 21 November 2011)	(Note: Player's contract was then cancelled on 2 February 2012.)
2	(Scotland)	DF	Hutton	29	2	2	—	1	—	31	2		
30	(United States)	DF	Lichaj	9	1	—	—	1	—	10	0		
24	(Spain)	DF	Cuéllar	17	1	1	—	—	—	18	1		
5	(Republic of Ireland)	DF	Dunne	28	—	2	—	2	—	31	0		
6	(Wales)	DF	Collins	31	1	1	—	1	—	34	1		
21	(Republic of Ireland)	DF	Clark	13	2	2	—	1	—	15	2		
32	(England)	DF	Baker	6	3	—	—	—	—	6	2		
3	(England)	DF	Warnock	34	1	2	—	1	—	35	1		
31	(Australia)	MF	Herd	19	—	—	—	1	—	19	0		
19	(Bulgaria)	MF	Petrov	26	1	2	—	1	—	27	1		
16	(England)	MF	Delph	10	1	—	—	—	—	10	1	(Note: Loaned out until February to Leeds United on 20 January 2012)	
38	(England)	MF	Gardner	5	9	—	2	—	—	5	11	(Note: Loaned out until January to Coventry City on 24 November 2011, before being recalled in late December (all appearances made after return from loan spell))	
7	(Republic of Ireland)	MF	Ireland	19	5	2	—	2	—	21	5		
17	(Cameroon)	MF	Makoun	—	—	—	—	1	—	1	0	(Note: Loaned out until end of season to Olympiacos on 28 August 2011)	
25	(Scotland)	MF	Bannan	10	17	—	2	2	—	12	19		
8	(England)	MF	Jenas	1	2	—	—	—	—	1	2	(Note: Returned to Tottenham Hotspur in early December after being on loan at Villa since August (all appearances made in first half of season))	
40	(Republic of Ireland)	MF	Carruthers	—	3	—	—	—	—	0	3		
12	(England)	MF	Albrighton	15	11	1	—	2	—	18	9		
10	(France)	MF	N'Zogbia	24	6	—	—	1	1	27	6		
26	(Austria)	FW	Weimann	5	9	—	—	—	1	5	10	(Note: Loaned out for five months to Watford on 26 August 2011, before being recalled in late September (all appearances made after return from loan spell))	
14	(England)	FW	Delfouneso	1	5	—	—	1	1	2	6	(Note: Loaned out until February to Leicester City on 23 January 2012)	
18	(England)	FW	Heskey	18	10	1	—	—	—	20	10		
20	(Republic of Ireland)	FW	Keane	5	1	1	—	—	—	6	1	(Note: On loan at Villa from Los Angeles Galaxy from 12 January – 25 February 2012 (all appearances made in second half of season))	
11	(England)	FW	Agbonlahor	32	1	1	1	1	—	34	2		
9	(England)	FW	Bent	21	1	2	—	1	—	24	1		

Last updated: 13 May 2012.

Includes Cup competitions as well (Carling Cup and FA Cup)

=== Goalscorers ===
Correct as of 13 May 2012
Players are listed by their position on the club's official website Source Players highlighted in light grey denote the player had scored for the club before leaving for another club
Players highlighted in light cyan denote the player has scored for the club after arriving at Aston Villa during the season
Players highlighted in blonde denote the player has scored for the club before leaving the club on loan for part/the rest of the season

Pos.	Playing pos.	Nation	Name	Premier League	FA Cup	League Cup	Total
1	FW	(England)	Darren Bent	9	1		10
2	FW	(England)	Gabriel Agbonlahor	5	1		6
3	MF	(Bulgaria)	Stiliyan Petrov	4			4
4	MF	(England)	Marc Albrighton	2	1		3
4	FW	(Republic of Ireland)	Robbie Keane	3			3
6	DF	(England)	Stephen Warnock	2			2
6	DF	(Republic of Ireland)	Richard Dunne	1	1		2
6	DF	(Republic of Ireland)	Ciaran Clark	1	1		2
6	DF	(United States)	Eric Lichaj	1		1	2
6	MF	(France)	Charles N'Zogbia	2			2
6	FW	(Austria)	Andreas Weimann	2			2
7	DF	(Wales)	James Collins	1			1
7	MF	(Republic of Ireland)	Stephen Ireland	1			1
7	MF	(Scotland)	Barry Bannan	1			1
7	MF	(Australia)	Chris Herd	1			1
7	FW	(England)	Nathan Delfouneso			1	1
7	FW	(England)	Emile Heskey	1			1
			Total goals	37	5	2	44

=== Disciplinary record ===
Correct as of 13 May 2012
Players are listed by their position on the club's official website Source Players highlighted in light grey denote the player has received a yellow/red card for the club before leaving for another club
Players highlighted in light cyan denote the player has received a yellow/red card for the club after arriving at Aston Villa during the season
Players highlighted in blonde denote the player has received a yellow/red card for the club before leaving the club on loan for part/the rest of the season

Number	Nation	Position	Name	Premier League		FA Cup		League Cup		Total	
Number	Nation	Position	Name	Yellow card	Red card	Yellow card	Red card	Yellow card	Red card	Yellow card	Red card
5	(Republic of Ireland)	DF	Richard Dunne	7	0	1	0	0	0	8	0
6	(Wales)	DF	James Collins	7	0	0	0	0	0	7	0
19	(Bulgaria)	MF	Stiliyan Petrov	7	0	0	0	0	0	7	0
2	(Scotland)	DF	Alan Hutton	6	1	0	0	0	0	6	1
3	(England)	DF	Stephen Warnock	6	0	0	0	0	0	6	0
11	(England)	FW	Gabriel Agbonlahor	6	0	0	0	0	0	6	0
30	(United States)	DF	Eric Lichaj	3	0	0	0	1	0	4	0
10	(France)	MF	Charles N'Zogbia	4	0	0	0	0	0	4	0
21	(Republic of Ireland)	DF	Ciaran Clark	3	0	0	0	0	0	3	0
12	(England)	MF	Marc Albrighton	3	0	0	0	0	0	3	0
16	(England)	MF	Fabian Delph	3	0	0	0	0	0	3	0
25	(Scotland)	MF	Barry Bannan	2	0	0	0	1	0	3	0
18	(England)	FW	Emile Heskey	3	0	0	0	0	0	3	0
24	(Spain)	DF	Carlos Cuéllar	2	0	0	0	0	0	2	0
7	(Republic of Ireland)	MF	Stephen Ireland	2	0	0	0	0	0	2	0
31	(Australia)	MF	Chris Herd	2	1	0	0	0	0	2	1 (Note: Red card against West Bromwich Albion on 22 October 2011 was rescinded on appeal.)
1	(Republic of Ireland)	GK	Shay Given	1	0	0	0	0	0	1	0
38	(England)	MF	Gary Gardner	1	0	0	0	0	0	1	0
40	(Republic of Ireland)	MF	Samir Carruthers	1	0	0	0	0	0	1	0
9	(England)	FW	Darren Bent	1	0	0	0	0	0	1	0
26	(Austria)	FW	Andreas Weimann	0	0	0	0	1	0	1	0
			TOTALS	70	2	1	0	3	0	74	1

=== Home attendances ===
Correct as of 6 May 2012
Win Draw Loss

Comp	Week/Round	Date	Score	Opponent	Attendance
Premier League	Wk 2	20 August 2011	3–1	Blackburn Rovers	32,319
League Cup	Rd 2	23 August 2011	2–0	Hereford United	21,058
Premier League	Wk 3	27 August 2011	0–0	Wolverhampton Wanderers	30,776
Premier League	Wk 5	17 September 2011	1–1	Newcastle United	34,248
League Cup	Rd 3	20 September 2011	0–2	Bolton Wanderers	22,261
Premier League	Wk 7	1 October 2011	2–0	Wigan Athletic	30,744
Premier League	Wk 9	22 October 2011	1–2	West Bromwich Albion	34,152
Premier League	Wk 11	5 November 2011	3–2	Norwich City	35,290
Premier League	Wk 14	3 December 2011	0–1	Manchester United	40,053
Premier League	Wk 16	18 December 2011	0–2	Liverpool	37,460
Premier League	Wk 17	21 December 2011	1–2	Arsenal	35,818
Premier League	Wk 20	2 January 2012	0–2	Swansea City	35,642
Premier League	Wk 21	14 January 2012	1–1	Everton	31,853
Premier League	Wk 23	1 February 2012	2–2	Queens Park Rangers	32,063
Premier League	Wk 25	12 February 2012	0–1	Manchester City	35,132
Premier League	Wk 28	10 March 2012	1–0	Fulham	32,372
Premier League	Wk 30	31 March 2012	2–4	Chelsea	34,740
Premier League	Wk 32	9 April 2012	1–1	Stoke City	30,100
Premier League	Wk 34	21 April 2012	0–0	Sunderland	32,557
Premier League	Wk 35	24 April 2012	1–2	Bolton Wanderers	32,263
Premier League	Wk 37	6 May 2012	1–1	Tottenham Hotspur	36,008
				Total attendance	686,099
				Average league attendance	33,873
				Average attendance	32,643
