= List of Aston Villa F.C. managers =

This chronological list of managers of Aston Villa Football Club comprises all those who have held the position of secretary or manager of the first team of Aston Villa since the formation of the club in 1874. From 1874 to 1934, the team was selected by a committee whose secretary had the same powers and role as a manager has today. There were two secretaries during this period, George Ramsay and W. J. Smith. The most successful person to manage the club was George Ramsay, who won six FA Cups and six First Division championships in his 42-year reign as secretary. Jimmy McMullan became the first full-time manager in 1934. Aston Villa were the first top-tier club to appoint a manager from outside the United Kingdom or Ireland when Jozef Vengloš was appointed in 1990.

Manager turnover has increased substantially over the past 30 years. The chairman of the time, Doug Ellis, acquired the nickname "Deadly Doug" because of his penchant for hiring and firing managers. In the 37 years that Ellis was involved with the Board, he hired and fired 13 out of the 24 managers that Aston Villa have had over their 133-year history. One of Ellis's last acts before selling the club to Randy Lerner was to appoint Martin O'Neill, who was with the club from 4 August 2006 to 9 August 2010.

== Managers ==
Information correct as of 24 October 2026. Only competitive matches are counted. Temporary and caretaker managers are not included in this list.

Table of Aston Villa F.C. managers, including tenure, record and honours
Manager	Nationality	From	To	Matches	Won	Drawn	Lost	Win% (Note: Win percentage is rounded to two decimal places)	Honours	Notes
George Ramsay (Note: Secretary of the committee that chose the team)	Scotland	August 1884	May 1926	1,327	658	414	255	49.59	First Division champions: 1893–94, 1895–96, 1896–97, 1898–99, 1899–1900, 1909–10; FA Cup winners: 1886–87, 1894–95, 1896–97, 1904–05, 1912–13, 1919–20	
W. J. Smith	England	August 1926	May 1934	364	175	67	122	48.08	-	
Jimmy McMullan	Scotland	June 1934	October 1936	55	17	15	23	30.91	-	
Jimmy Hogan	England	Summer 1936	September 1939	124	57	26	41	45.97	Second Division champions: 1937–38	
Alex Massie	Scotland	August 1945	August 1950	189	76	46	67	40.21	-	
George Martin	Scotland	December 1950	August 1953	119	47	30	42	39.50	-	
Eric Houghton	England	September 1953	November 1958	250	88	65	97	35.20	FA Cup winners: 1956–57	
Joe Mercer	England	December 1958	July 1964	282	120	63	99	42.55	Second Division champions: 1959–60; League Cup winners: 1960–61	
Dick Taylor	England	July 1964	May 1967	144	51	22	71	35.42	-	
Tommy Cummings	England	July 1967	November 1968	62	18	14	30	29.03	-	
Tommy Docherty	Scotland	December 1968	January 1970	46	13	16	17	28.26	-	
Vic Crowe	Wales	January 1970	May 1974	199	88	55	56	44.22	Third Division champions: 1971–72	
Ron Saunders	England	June 1974	February 1982	353	157	98	98	44.48	First Division champions: 1980–81; League Cup winners: 1974–75, 1976–77; Aston Villa Hall of Fame (Note: The Aston Villa Hall of Fame was voted for by fans and to this date there has been one induction of 12 players and managers in 2006.)	
Tony Barton	England	February 1982	June 1984	130	58	24	48	44.62	European Cup winners: 1981–82; European Super Cup winners: 1982	
Graham Turner	England	July 1984	September 1986	105	33	29	43	31.43	-	
Billy McNeill	Scotland	September 1986	May 1987	41	9	15	17	21.95	-	
Graham Taylor	England	May 1987	July 1990	142	65	35	42	45.77	-	
Jozef Vengloš	Czechoslovakia	July 1990	May 1991	49	16	15	18	32.65	-	
Ron Atkinson	England	July 1991	November 1994	178	77	45	56	43.26	League Cup winners: 1993–94	
Brian Little	England	November 1994	February 1998	164	68	45	51	41.46	League Cup winners: 1995–96; Aston Villa Hall of Fame	
John Gregory	England	February 1998	January 2002	190	82	52	56	43.16	Intertoto Cup winners: 2001	
Graham Taylor	England	February 2002	May 2003	60	19	14	27	31.67	-	
David O'Leary	Ireland	May 2003	July 2006	131	47	35	49	35.88	-	
Martin O'Neill	Northern Ireland	August 2006	August 2010	190	80	60	50	42.11	-	
Gérard Houllier	France	September 2010	June 2011	36	14	8	14	38.89	-	
Alex McLeish	Scotland	June 2011	May 2012	42	9	17	16	21.43	-	
Paul Lambert	Scotland	June 2012	February 2015	115	34	26	55	29.57	-	
Tim Sherwood	England	February 2015	October 2015	28	10	2	16	35.71	-	
Rémi Garde	France	November 2015	March 2016	23	3	7	13	13.04	-	
Roberto Di Matteo	Italy	June 2016	October 2016	12	1	7	4	8.33	-	
Steve Bruce	England	October 2016	October 2018	102	46	25	31	45.10	-	
Dean Smith	England	October 2018	November 2021	134	55	28	51	41.04	Play-off winners: 2018–19	
Steven Gerrard	England	November 2021	October 2022	40	13	8	19	32.50	-	
Unai Emery	Spain	November 2022	Ongoing	209	116	36	57	55.50	Europa League winners: 2025–26	
