= 2010–11 Aston Villa F.C. season =

English football club season

Aston Villa
2010–11 season
- Chairman: Randy Lerner
- Manager: Martin O'Neill (until 9 August); Kevin MacDonald (caretaker)(from 9 August to 8 September); Gérard Houllier (from 8 September to 23 April); Gary McAllister (caretaker) (from 23 April to 22 May)
- Stadium: Villa Park
- Premier League: 9th
- FA Cup: Fifth round
- League Cup: Quarter-finals
- UEFA Europa League: Play-off round
- Top goalscorer: League: Darren Bent (9 goals); All: Darren Bent; Ashley Young (9 each)
- Highest home attendance: 42,785 vs Liverpool (22 May 2011)
- Lowest home attendance: 18,753 vs Blackburn Rovers (22 September 2010)
- Average home league attendance: 37,273 (League); 35,548 (All)
| Home colours | Away colours | Third colours |

Second City Derby
- 54--37--30

The 2010-11 season was Aston Villa's 19th season in the Premier League. The 2010–11 Premier League season was Villa's 136th season in English football. It was the club's 100th season in the top-flight; and their 23rd consecutive season in the top flight of English football, the Premier League. It was also the first (and only) season under French manager Gérard Houllier, who was appointed after previous boss Martin O'Neill resigned on 9 August 2010. Despite a generally disappointing season in both the league and cup competitions, a late surge allowed the club to finish in 9th position in the Premier League (3 places lower than their 6th-place finish the previous season).

Aston Villa once again competed in the UEFA Europa League, marking their 2nd consecutive season in the tournament and 3rd consecutive season in European competition overall. However, after drawing the away fixture, Aston Villa were eliminated for the second consecutive year in the play-off round, and again at the hands of Rapid Vienna.

This season marked the first time that four West Midlands county clubs performed in the Premier League. Aston Villa once again contested the Second City derby with Birmingham City, who remain in the league, alongside Wolverhampton Wanderers, who also avoided relegation. West Bromwich Albion also joined them in the league, meaning that Villa contested a total of six local derbies throughout the duration of the Premier League season. An additional derby game at Birmingham City took place on 1 December 2010 in the Football League Cup.

Notable events include Kyle Walker scoring on his debut only nine minutes into the match against former club Sheffield United in the third round of the FA Cup in January 2011. In February, Walker scored his first ever Premier League goal, a 30-yard strike low into the left corner against Fulham.

== Kits ==
| Kit Supplier | Sponsor |
|---|---|
| Nike | Fx Pro |

| Home | Home alt. | Home alt. 2 | Away | Away alt. | Goalkeeper 1 | Goalkeeper 2 | Goalkeeper 3 |

== Players ==
Updated 21 January 2011.

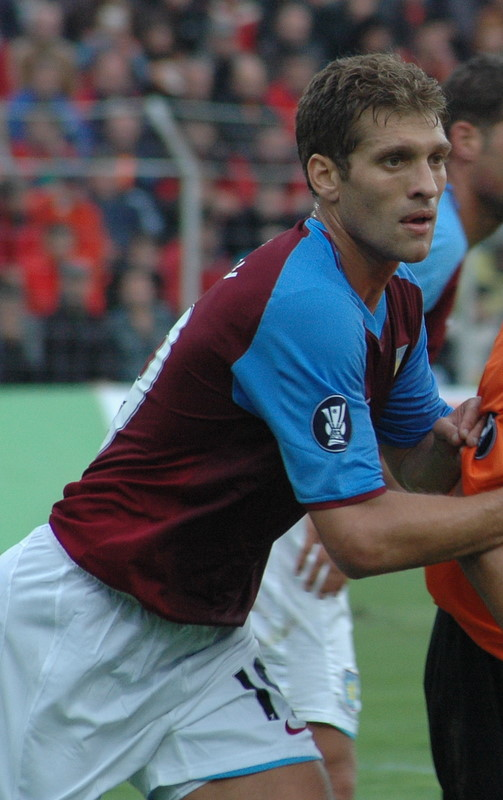
Stiliyan Petrov, the captain of Aston Villa for 2010–11.

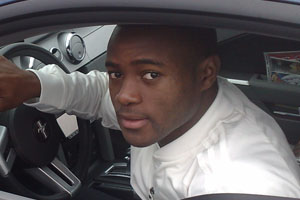
Nigel Reo-Coker is the club's vice-captain for this season.

=== Premier League squad ===
Players under 21 do not need to be named and can still be used.

Note: Flags indicate national team as defined under FIFA eligibility rules; some limited exceptions apply. Players may hold more than one non-FIFA nationality.

| No. | Pos. | Nation | Player |
|---|---|---|---|
| 1 | GK | USA | Brad Friedel |
| 2 | DF | ENG | Luke Young |
| 3 | DF | ENG | Stephen Warnock |
| 5 | DF | IRL | Richard Dunne |
| 6 | MF | ENG | Stewart Downing |
| 7 | MF | ENG | Ashley Young |
| 8 | MF | FRA | Robert Pires |
| 9 | MF | IRL | Stephen Ireland |
| 10 | FW | NOR | John Carew (on loan to Stoke City during the playing season) |
| 11 | FW | ENG | Gabriel Agbonlahor |
| 13 | MF | USA | Michael Bradley (on loan from Borussia Mönchengladbach during the playing season) |
| 17 | MF | CMR | Jean Makoun |
| 18 | FW | ENG | Emile Heskey |

| No. | Pos. | Nation | Player |
|---|---|---|---|
| 19 | MF | BUL | Stiliyan Petrov (captain) |
| 20 | MF | ENG | Nigel Reo-Coker (vice-captain) |
| 22 | GK | USA | Brad Guzan |
| 23 | DF | SEN | Habib Beye |
| 24 | DF | ESP | Carlos Cuéllar |
| 27 | MF | ENG | Isaiah Osbourne |
| 28 | MF | ENG | Jonathan Hogg |
| 29 | DF | WAL | James Collins |
| 30 | DF | USA | Eric Lichaj (on loan to Leeds United during the playing season) |
| 33 | GK | ENG | Andy Marshall |
| 36 | DF | ENG | Kyle Walker (on loan from Tottenham Hotspur during the playing season) |
| 37 | MF | TOG | Moustapha Salifou |
| 39 | FW | ENG | Darren Bent |

Under-21 Players

Note: Flags indicate national team as defined under FIFA eligibility rules; some limited exceptions apply. Players may hold more than one non-FIFA nationality.

| No. | Pos. | Nation | Player |
|---|---|---|---|
| 12 | MF | ENG | Marc Albrighton |
| 14 | FW | ENG | Nathan Delfouneso |
| 16 | MF | ENG | Fabian Delph |
| 21 | DF | IRL | Ciaran Clark |
| 25 | MF | SCO | Barry Bannan |
| 31 | MF | AUS | Chris Herd |

| No. | Pos. | Nation | Player |
|---|---|---|---|
| 32 | DF | ENG | Nathan Baker |
| 34 | DF | AUS | Shane Lowry |
| 35 | MF | ENG | Daniel Johnson |
| 42 | FW | AUT | Andreas Weimann |
| 43 | GK | ENG | Elliot Parish |

UEFA Europa League Players

These players were not part of Aston Villa's Premier League squad, but were given squad numbers and selected to play for the club in the UEFA Europa League.
Note: Flags indicate national team as defined under FIFA eligibility rules; some limited exceptions apply. Players may hold more than one non-FIFA nationality.

| No. | Pos. | Nation | Player |
|---|---|---|---|
| 51 | DF | ENG | Durrell Berry |
| 53 | DF | ENG | Ellis Deeney |
| 54 | DF | ENG | Calum Flanagan (on loan at Kettering Town) |
| 55 | FW | ENG | Harry Forrester |

| No. | Pos. | Nation | Player |
|---|---|---|---|
| 56 | MF | ENG | Gary Gardner |
| 57 | MF | ENG | Jason Lampkin |
| 58 | MF | HUN | András Stieber |
| 59 | GK | SUI | Benjamin Siegrist |

==== Squad numbers ====
Villa's squad numbers for this season were announced on 12 August 2010. The only major changes from the previous year saw defender Stephen Warnock wearing the number 3 shirt which had last belonged to Wilfred Bouma, and Stephen Ireland take over Marlon Harewood's number 9.

Villa's squad numbers were revised ahead of the Premier League fixture at home to Bolton Wanderers on 19 September 2010. Many of the club's young players had their numbers reduced below 30, with the exception of goalkeeper Elliot Parish, who remained at number 43. Andy Marshall retained the number 33 shirt on his return to the club.

Robert Pires took the number 8 shirt on his arrival at the club, which was previously worn by James Milner. Loan signing Kyle Walker received the number 36 shirt, while incoming striker Darren Bent acquired number 39. Newly signed midfielder Jean Makoun took over the number 17 shirt from teammate Moustapha Salifou, who remained without a replacement squad number. Michael Bradley took over the vacant number 13 shirt upon his arrival to Villa on loan from Borussia Mönchengladbach.

== Managerial changes ==
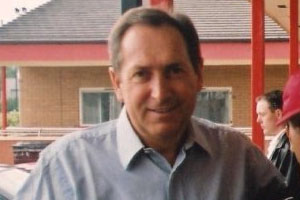
Gérard Houllier, Aston Villa's new manager for the 2010–11 season.

Aston Villa completed their pre-season preparations under former boss Martin O'Neill. However, he resigned from his position as manager on 9 August 2010, just five days before Villa's opening Premier League tie at home to West Ham United. Reserve team coach Kevin MacDonald was appointed as caretaker manager with immediate effect.

MacDonald managed Villa until 8 September 2010, when former Liverpool and Olympique Lyonnais manager Gérard Houllier was officially announced as O'Neill's successor. MacDonald had previously announced his intentions to apply for the position on a full-time basis, however the club opted to sign Houllier instead. MacDonald did however take charge of Villa's next two games, before Houllier officially took the reins on 22 September after fulfilling his duties with the France national team.

On 22 April 2011, Gérard Houllier was taken to hospital with chest pains with the doctors fearing another heart attack (he suffered a heart attack in 2001 while manager of Liverpool). It was later ruled out with the Frenchman ordered to bed rest and medicine. Assistant manager Gary McAllister took charge of Houllier's managerial duties on 23 April for the Premier League match with Stoke City at Villa Park, and it was later revealed that Houllier would not be able to return to the touchline until after the end of the season.

| Date | Outgoing Manager | New Club | Incoming Manager | Previous Team | Notes |
| 9 August 2010 | (Northern Ireland) Martin O'Neill | (Europe) Unattached | (Scotland) Kevin MacDonald (Caretaker) | (England) Aston Villa Reserves | |
| 8 September 2010 | (Scotland) Kevin MacDonald (Caretaker) | (England) Aston Villa Reserves | (France) Gérard Houllier | (France) Lyon | Houllier officially took charge on 22 September 2010. |

== Transfers ==
=== In ===
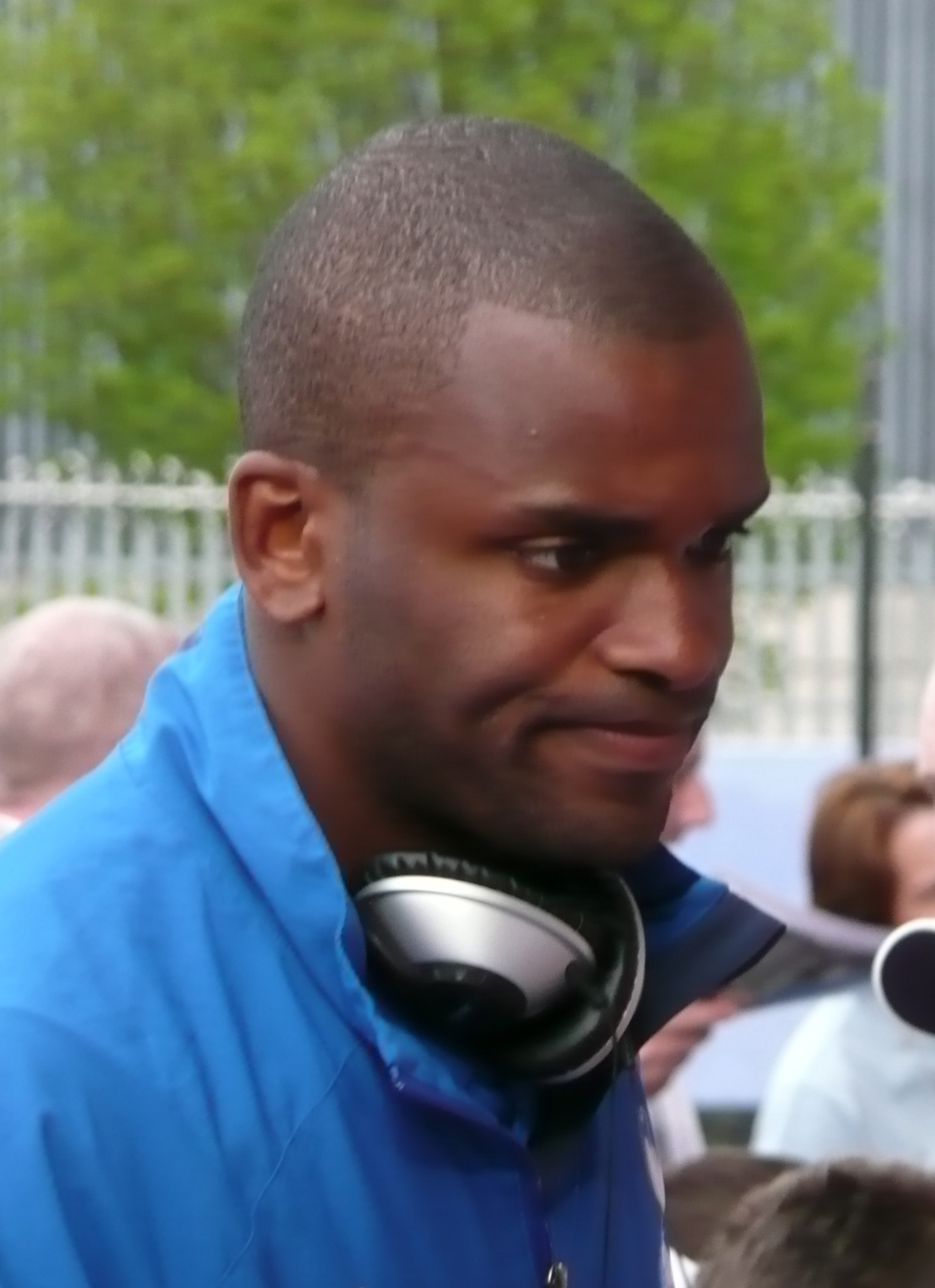
Darren Bent became Aston Villa's record signing after joining from Sunderland.

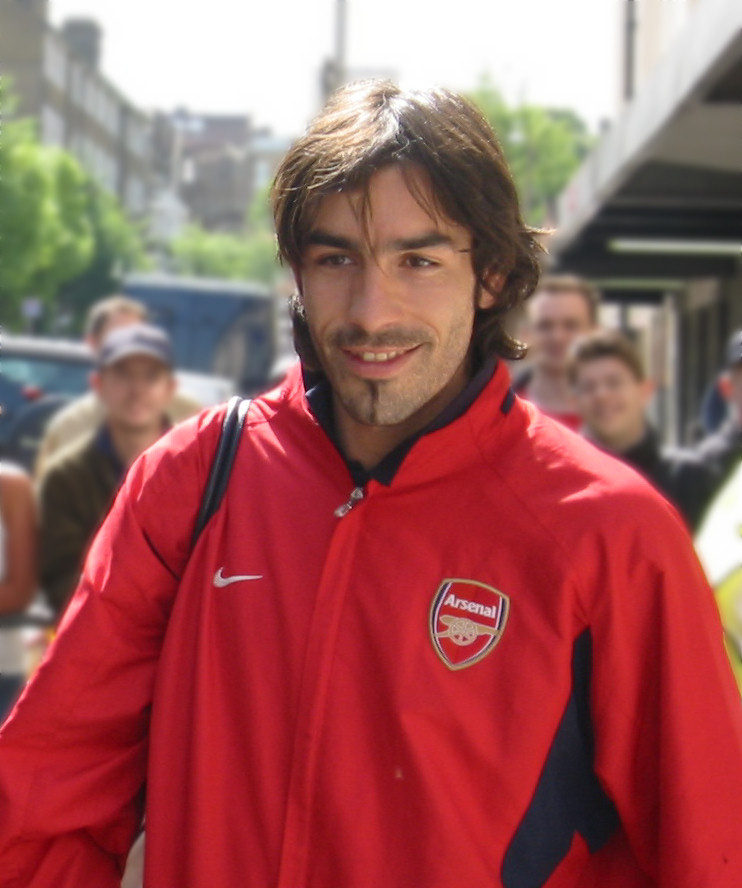
World Cup-winning midfielder Robert Pires joined Aston Villa on a free transfer in November 2010.

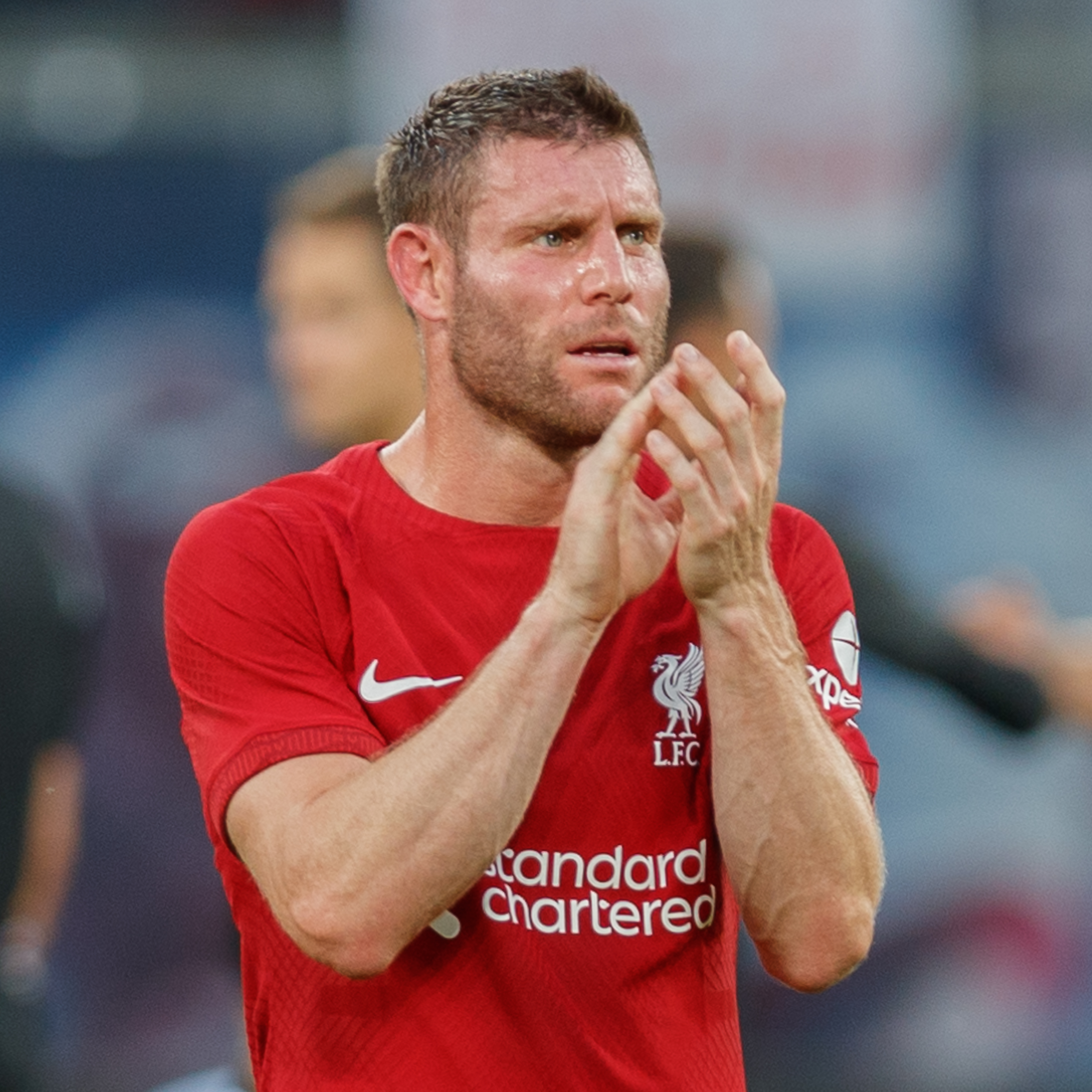
Manchester City signed James Milner for an estimated £26 million at the season start, then the highest transfer fee received by Aston Villa.

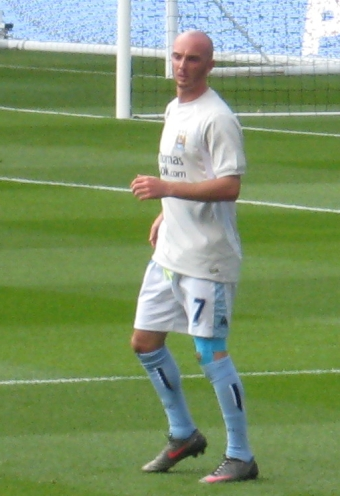
Stephen Ireland joined from Manchester City at the beginning of the season, but left on loan in January to sign for Newcastle United.

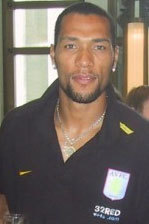
John Carew, Villa's top scorer during 2009–10, left on loan for Stoke City in January 2011.

Summer

| Date | Position | Player name | Previous club | League | Transfer fee | Notes |
|---|---|---|---|---|---|---|
| 18 August 2010 | MF | (Republic of Ireland) Stephen Ireland | (England) Manchester City | (England) Premier League | £8 million | Part exchanged for James Milner |
| 3 September 2010 | GK | (England) Andy Marshall | (England) Aston Villa | (England) Premier League | Free transfer | Player initially released, but rejoined the club on 3 September 2010. |

Winter

| Date | Position | Player name | Previous club | League | Transfer fee | Notes |
|---|---|---|---|---|---|---|
| 18 November 2010 | MF | (France) Robert Pires | (Spain) Villarreal | (Spain) Primera División | Free transfer | Player unattached following release from Villarreal |
| 15 January 2011 | MF | (Cameroon) Jean Makoun | (France) Lyon | (France) Ligue 1 | Undisclosed fee | Fee believed to be in region of £6 million |
| 18 January 2011 | FW | (England) Darren Bent | (England) Sunderland | (England) Premier League | £18 million | Club record transfer fee, with add-ons potentially rising to £24 million. |

=== Loans in ===
Winter

| Date | Position | Player name | New club | League | Duration | Return |
|---|---|---|---|---|---|---|
| 6 January 2011 | DF | (England) Kyle Walker | (England) Tottenham Hotspur | (England) Premier League | 5 months | End of season |
| 31 January 2011 | MF | (United States) Michael Bradley | (Germany) Borussia Mönchengladbach | (Germany) Bundesliga | 5 months | End of season |

==== Trialists ====
| Date | Position | Player name | Club | League | Return | Notes |
|---|---|---|---|---|---|---|
| 28 December 2010 | FW | (Jamaica) Omar Cummings | (United States) Colorado Rapids | (United States) Major League Soccer | 18 January 2011 | Had been on trial with a view to a 3-month loan deal. Player was not signed due to work permit issues. |

=== Out ===
Summer

| Date | Position | Player name | New club | League | Transfer fee | Notes |
|---|---|---|---|---|---|---|
| 1 July 2010 | DF | (Netherlands) Wilfred Bouma | (Netherlands) PSV Eindhoven | (Netherlands) Eredivisie | Free | |
| 1 July 2010 | FW | (England) Marlon Harewood | (England) Blackpool | (England) Premier League | Free | |
| 1 July 2010 | GK | (England) Andy Marshall | (England) Aston Villa | (England) Premier League | Released | Player initially released, but rejoined the club on 3 September 2010. |
| 1 July 2010 | DF | (Republic of Ireland) Stephen O'Halloran | (England) Coventry City | (England) Championship | Free | |
| 13 July 2010 | GK | (Republic of Ireland) David Bevan | (England) Walsall | (England) League One | Free | Youth player |
| 23 July 2010 | MF | (England) Jack Dyer | (England) Burton Albion | (England) League Two | Free | Youth player |
| 9 August 2010 | DF | (England) Nicky Shorey | (England) West Bromwich Albion | (England) Premier League | Undisclosed | |
| 18 August 2010 | MF | (England) James Milner | (England) Manchester City | (England) Premier League | £26 million | Club record. Stephen Ireland accepted in part exchange |

Winter

| Date | Position | Player name | New club | League | Transfer fee |
|---|---|---|---|---|---|
| 7 January 2011 | FW | (Republic of Ireland) James Collins Jr | (England) Shrewsbury Town | (England) League Two | Undisclosed |
| 7 January 2011 | MF | (England) Steve Sidwell | (England) Fulham | (England) Premier League | Undisclosed |
| 28 January 2011 | DF | (England) Curtis Davies | (England) Birmingham City | (England) Premier League | Undisclosed |

==== Loans out ====
Summer

| Date | Position | Player name | New club | League | Duration | Return |
|---|---|---|---|---|---|---|
| 26 August 2010 | FW | (England) Harry Forrester | (Scotland) Kilmarnock | (Scotland) Scottish Premier League | 5 months | January 2011 |

Winter

| Date | Position | Player name | New club | League | Duration | Return |
|---|---|---|---|---|---|---|
| 15 October 2010 | DF | (England) Curtis Davies | (England) Leicester City | (England) Championship | 1 month | November 2010 |
| 15 October 2010 | FW | (Republic of Ireland) James Collins Jr | (England) Burton Albion | (England) League Two | 1 month | November 2010 |
| 10 November 2010 | DF | (England) Curtis Davies | (England) Leicester City | (England) Championship | 2 months | January 2011 |
| 1 January 2011 | GK | (United States) Brad Guzan | (England) Hull City | (England) Championship | 2 months | February 2011 |
| 13 January 2011 | DF | (Australia) Shane Lowry | (England) Sheffield United | (England) Championship | 5 months | End of season |
| 19 January 2011 | FW | (Austria) Andreas Weimann | (England) Watford | (England) Championship | 5 months | End of season |
| 21 January 2011 | FW | (Norway) John Carew | (England) Stoke City | (England) Premier League | 5 months | End of season |
| 25 January 2011 | MF | (England) Jonathan Hogg | (England) Portsmouth | (England) Championship | 5 Months | End of season |
| 29 January 2011 | DF | (Netherlands) Arsenio Halfhuid | (Netherlands) Volendam | (Netherlands) Eerste Divisie | 5 months | End of season |
| 31 January 2011 | MF | (England) Isaiah Osbourne | (England) Sheffield Wednesday | (England) League One | 5 months | End of season |
| 31 January 2011 | MF | (Republic of Ireland) Stephen Ireland | (England) Newcastle United | (England) Premier League | 5 months | End of season |
| 9 February 2011 | DF | (United States) Eric Lichaj | (England) Leeds United | (England) Championship | 1 month | March 2011 |
| 26 February 2011 | DF | (England) Calum Flanagan | (England) Kettering Town | (England) Conference National | 5 months | End of season |

Spring

| Date | Position | Player name | New club | League | Duration | Return |
|---|---|---|---|---|---|---|
| 8 March 2011 | MF | (Scotland) Barry Bannan | (England) Leeds United | (England) Championship | 1 month | End of season (recalled in April) |
| 8 March 2011 | FW | (England) Nathan Delfouneso | (England) Burnley | (England) Championship | 2 months | End of season (returned in May) |
| 8 March 2011 | GK | (United States) Brad Guzan | (England) Hull City | (England) Championship | Short-term emergency loan | May 2011 |
| 25 March 2011 | GK | (England) Elliot Parish | (England) Lincoln City | (England) League Two | End of season | May 2011 |

== Fixtures and results ==
=== Premier League ===
Villa again competed in the Premier League, after finishing sixth for the third season in a row during 2009–10. The fixtures were officially announced on 17 June 2010.

==== Results by matchday ====
| Matchday | 1 | 2 | 3 | 4 | 5 | 6 | 7 | 8 | 9 | 10 | 11 | 12 | 13 | 14 | 15 | 16 | 17 | 18 | 19 | 20 | 21 | 22 | 23 | 24 | 25 | 26 | 27 | 28 | 29 | 30 | 31 | 32 | 33 | 34 | 35 | 36 | 37 | 38 |
|---|---|---|---|---|---|---|---|---|---|---|---|---|---|---|---|---|---|---|---|---|---|---|---|---|---|---|---|---|---|---|---|---|---|---|---|---|---|---|
| Ground | H | A | H | A | H | A | A | H | A | H | A | H | H | A | H | A | H | A | H | A | A | H | A | H | A | H | A | H | A | H | A | H | A | H | A | H | A | H |
| Result | W | L | W | L | D | W | L | D | L | D | D | W | D | L | L | L | W | W | L | L | D | L | D | W | L | D | D | W | L | L | D | W | W | D | L | D | W | W |
| Position | 3 | 12 | 4 | 7 | 8 | 5 | 8 | 8 | 10 | 14 | 14 | 10 | 9 | 13 | 15 | 16 | 14 | 12 | 13 | 15 | 13 | 14 | 15 | 14 | 15 | 15 | 16 | 12 | 13 | 14 | 15 | 14 | 12 | 13 | 13 | 14 | 13 | 9 |

Source: worldfootball.net
A = Away; H = Home; W = Win; D = Draw; L = Loss

| Date | Opponent | Venue | Result | Attendance | Scorers |
|---|---|---|---|---|---|
| 14 August 2010 | West Ham United | H | 3–0 | 36,604 | Downing 14', Petrov 40', Milner 66' |
| 22 August 2010 | Newcastle United | A | 0–6 | 43,546 | |
| 29 August 2010 | Everton | H | 1–0 | 34,725 | L. Young 9' |
| 13 September 2010 | Stoke City | A | 1–2 | 25,899 | Downing 35' |
| 18 September 2010 | Bolton Wanderers | H | 1–1 | 34,655 | A. Young 13' |
| 26 September 2010 | Wolverhampton Wanderers | A | 2–1 | 27,511 | Downing, Heskey |
| 2 October 2010 | Tottenham Hotspur | A | 1–2 | 35,871 | Albrighton |
| 16 October 2010 | Chelsea | H | 0–0 | 40,122 | |
| 23 October 2010 | Sunderland | A | 0–1 | 41,506 | |
| 31 October 2010 | Birmingham City | H | 0–0 | 40,688 | |
| 6 November 2010 | Fulham | A | 1–1 | 25,676 | Albrighton |
| 10 November 2010 | Blackpool | H | 3–2 | 34,330 | Downing, Delfouneso, Collins |
| 13 November 2010 | Manchester United | H | 2–2 | 40,073 | A. Young (p), Albrighton |
| 21 November 2010 | Blackburn Rovers | A | 0–2 | 21,848 | |
| 27 November 2010 | Arsenal | H | 2–4 | 38,544 | Clark (2) |
| 6 December 2010 | Liverpool | A | 0–3 | 39,079 | |
| 11 December 2010 | West Bromwich Albion | H | 2–1 | 37,015 | Downing, Heskey |
| 18 December 2010 | Wigan Athletic | A | P-P | | POSTPONED |
| 26 December 2010 | Tottenham Hotspur | H | 1–2 | 39,411 | Albrighton |
| 28 December 2010 | Manchester City | A | 0–4 | 46,716 | |
| 2 January 2011 | Chelsea | A | 3–3 | 41,222 | A. Young (p), Heskey, Clark |
| 5 January 2011 | Sunderland | H | 0–1 | 32,627 | |
| 16 January 2011 | Birmingham City | A | 1–1 | 22,287 | Collins |
| 22 January 2011 | Manchester City | H | 1–0 | 37,815 | Bent |
| 25 January 2011 | Wigan Athletic | A | 2–1 | 16,442 | Agbonlahor, A.Young (p) |
| 1 February 2011 | Manchester United | A | 1–3 | 75,256 | Bent |
| 5 February 2011 | Fulham | H | 2–2 | 35,899 | Paintsil (o.g.), Walker |
| 12 February 2011 | Blackpool | A | 1–1 | 16,000 | Agbonlahor |
| 26 February 2011 | Blackburn Rovers | H | 4–1 | 34,309 | A. Young (2, 1 p), Hanley (o.g.), Downing |
| 5 March 2011 | Bolton Wanderers | A | 2–3 | 22,533 | Bent, Albrighton |
| 19 March 2011 | Wolverhampton Wanderers | H | 0–1 | 38,965 | |
| 2 April 2011 | Everton | A | 2–2 | 37,619 | Bent (2) |
| 10 April 2011 | Newcastle United | H | 1–0 | 37,090 | Collins |
| 16 April 2011 | West Ham United | A | 2–1 | 33,000 | Bent, Agbonlahor |
| 23 April 2011 | Stoke City | H | 1–1 | 35,232 | Bent |
| 30 April 2011 | West Bromwich Albion | A | 1–2 | 25,889 | Méïté (o.g.) |
| 7 May 2011 | Wigan Athletic | H | 1–1 | 36,293 | A.Young |
| 15 May 2011 | Arsenal | A | 2–1 | 60,023 | Bent (2) |
| 22 May 2011 | Liverpool | H | 1–0 | 42,785 | Downing |

=== FA Cup ===
Villa entered the FA Cup at the third round, which is traditionally played in early January.

| Date | Round | Opponent | Venue | Result | Attendance | Scorers |
|---|---|---|---|---|---|---|
| 8 January 2011 | R3 | Sheffield United | A | 3–1 | 16,888 | Walker, Albrighton, Petrov |
| 29 January 2011 | R4 | Blackburn Rovers | H | 3–1 | 26,067 | Clark, Pires, Delfouneso |
| 2 March 2011 | R5 | Manchester City | A | 0–3 | 27,570 | |

=== League Cup ===
The club enter the League Cup at the third round as runners-up, after losing in the final of the previous year's tournament to Manchester United.

| Date | Round | Opponent | Venue | Result | Attendance | Scorers |
|---|---|---|---|---|---|---|
| 22 September 2010 | R3 | Blackburn Rovers | H | 3–1 | 18,753 | Heskey, A. Young (2) |
| 27 October 2010 | R4 | Burnley | H | 2–1 (aet) | 34,618 | Heskey, Downing |
| 1 December 2010 | QF | Birmingham City | A | 1–2 | 27,679 | Agbonlahor |

=== UEFA Europa League ===
Villa will again compete in the UEFA Europa League after finishing sixth in the Premier League of 2009–10. They will enter at the play-off round.

==== Play-off round ====
On 6 August 2010, Villa were drawn with Rapid Vienna of Austria in the play-off round, the same team that knocked them out at the same stage the previous season. The first leg of the tie was played away at the Gerhard Hanappi Stadium on 19 August, resulting in a 1–1 draw. The teams met again at Villa Park for the return fixture a week later on 26 August, with the Austrian side progressing once again thanks to a 3–2 win.

| Date | Round | Opponent | Venue | Result | Attendance | Scorers |
|---|---|---|---|---|---|---|
| 19 August 2010 | Play-off round (1) | (Austria) Rapid Vienna | A | 1–1 | 16,891 | Bannan |
| 26 August 2010 | Play-off round (2) | (Austria) Rapid Vienna | H | 2–3 | 29,980 | Agbonlahor, Heskey |
Rapid Vienna win 4–3 on aggregate.

=== Friendly matches ===
| Date | Opponent | Venue | Result | Attendance | Scorer(s) | Notes |
|---|---|---|---|---|---|---|
| 18 July 2010 | Basingstoke Town | A | 1–2 | | Burke | "Aston Villa XI" match |
| 19 July 2010 | Peterborough United | A | 3–2 | 1,500 | A. Young, Carew, Lichaj | |
| 24 July 2010 | (Republic of Ireland) Bohemians | A | 1–2 | | Carew | |
| 26 July 2010 | Chasetown | A | 0–0 | 600 (est.) | | "Aston Villa XI" match |
| 27 July 2010 | Walsall | A | 2–1 | 5,735 | Weimann (2) | |
| 6 August 2010 | (Spain) Valencia | H | 0–0 | | | |
| 24 August 2010 | Burton Albion | H | 5–0 | 0 | Forrester (2), Agbonlahor, Delfouneso, Collins Jnr | Behind-closed-doors friendly at Villa's Bodymoor Heath Training Ground |
| 28 September 2010 | Birmingham City | A | 0–0 | 0 | | Behind-closed-doors friendly at Birmingham City's Wast Hills Training Ground |

==== Guadiana Trophy ====
Villa played in the Guadiana Trophy in the summer as part of their pre-season preparations. The fixtures of this tournament were announced on 20 May 2010. All games were played at the Complexo Desportivo de Vila Real de Santo António in Vila Real de Santo António, Portugal.

As there were only three teams in this year's edition of the Guadiana Trophy, a penalty shootout was carried out at the end of each fixture to make sure that a clear winner could be selected. A penalty shootout was not played in the fixture against Benfica as their win marked them outright tournament winners.

Villa finished second out of third in the tournament.

| Date | Day of Tournament | Opponent | Venue | Result | Scorers (Normal Time) | Penalty Shootout Result | Scorers (Penalty Shootout) |
|---|---|---|---|---|---|---|---|
| 31 July 2010 | Day 2 | (Netherlands) Feyenoord | N | 3–1 | Albrighton, Heskey, Sidwell | (4–4) | (Carew, Bannan, Shorey, Sidwell) |
| 1 August 2010 | Day 3 | (Portugal) Benfica | N | 1–4 | Carew | | |

== Goalscorers ==
Players with the same number of goals are listed alphabetically
Players highlighted in light grey denote the player had scored for the club before leaving for another club
Players highlighted in light cyan denote the player has scored for the club after arriving at Aston Villa during the season
Players highlighted in Blonde denote the player has scored for the club before leaving the club on loan for part/the rest of the season

| Player | Premier League | FA Cup | League Cup | Europa League | Total |
|---|---|---|---|---|---|
| (England) Darren Bent | 9 | | | | 9 |
| (England) Ashley Young | 7 | | 2 | | 9 |
| (England) Stewart Downing | 7 | | 1 | | 8 |
| (England) Marc Albrighton | 5 | 1 | | | 6 |
| (England) Emile Heskey | 3 | | 2 | 1 | 6 |
| (England) Gabriel Agbonlahor | 3 | | 1 | 1 | 5 |
| (Republic of Ireland) Ciaran Clark | 3 | 1 | | | 4 |
| (Wales) James Collins | 3 | | | | 3 |
| (England) Nathan Delfouneso | 1 | 1 | | | 2 |
| (Bulgaria) Stiliyan Petrov | 1 | 1 | | | 2 |
| (England) Kyle Walker | 1 | 1 | | | 2 |
| (Scotland) Barry Bannan | | | | 1 | 1 |
| (England) James Milner | 1 | | | | 1 |
| (France) Robert Pires | | 1 | | | 1 |
| (England) Luke Young | 1 | | | | 1 |
| Own goals | 3 | | | | 3 |
| Total Goals | 48 | 6 | 6 | 3 | 63 |

== End of Season Awards ==
| Winner | Award | Runners-up/Other Nominees |
|---|---|---|
| (England) Stewart Downing | FxPro Top Star Award | (United States) Brad Friedel (England) Darren Bent (England) Ashley Young |
| (England) Stewart Downing | Fiat Supporters' Player of the Season | (United States) Brad Friedel (England) Darren Bent (England) Ashley Young |
| (England) Stewart Downing | Vodafone Players' Player of the Season | (United States) Brad Friedel (England) Darren Bent (England) Ashley Young |
| (England) Marc Albrighton | Supporters' Young Player of the Season | – |
| (England) Marc Albrighton | Terrace Trophy | – |
| (England) Marc Albrighton / (Republic of Ireland) Ciaran Clark (Shared) | Players' Young Player of the Year | – |
| (England) Marc Albrighton (vs. Fulham, 6 November 2010) | Goal of the Season | (England) Emile Heskey (vs. Wolverhampton Wanderers, 26 September 2010) |
| (England) Tony Morley | Aston Villa Former Players' Association Player of the Season | – |

== Sponsorship ==
The logo of FxPro which is set to appear on Aston Villa's shirt

In June 2010, it was revealed on Aston Villa's official website that a new sponsorship deal with Cyprus-based company FxPro Financial Services Limited that will run from 2010 until 2013. The deal, described as "the biggest in the club's history", replaced the charity sponsorship that Aston Villa had with Acorns Children's Hospice for the previous two seasons. However, Acorns were still named as the official charity partner of the club. In February 2011, it was announced that Aston Villa and FxPro had agreed to terminate the deal at the end of the season by mutual consent.
