= Nathan Delfouneso =

English footballer (born 1991)

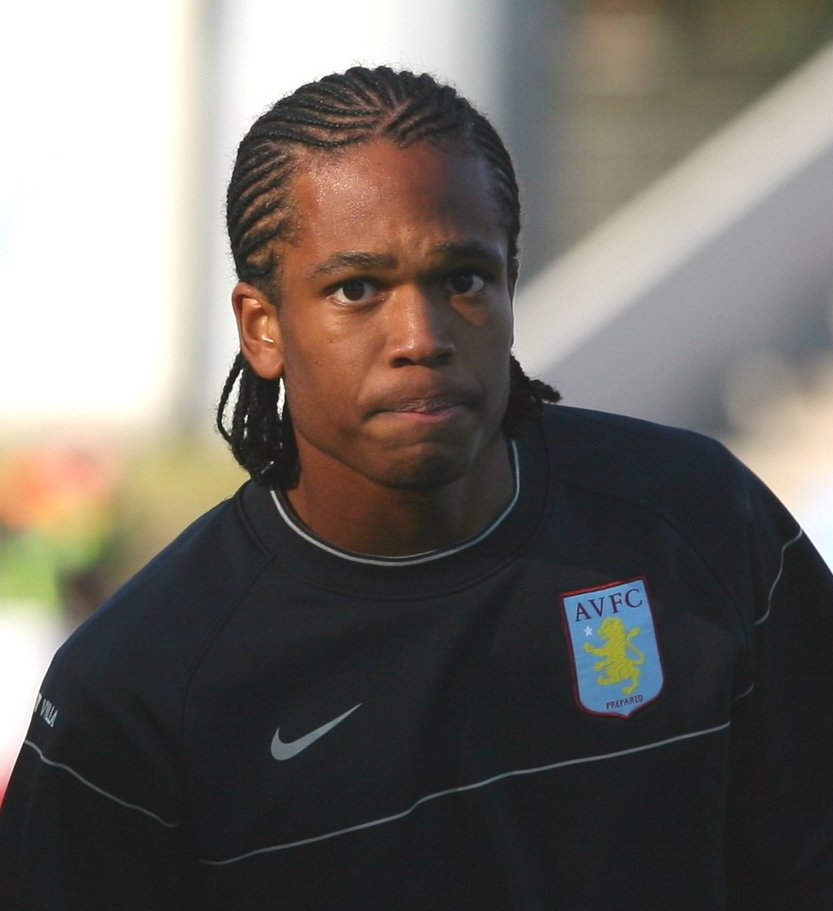
- Delfouneso training with Aston Villa in 2008

Personal information
- Full name: Nathan Abayomi Delfouneso
- Date of birth: 2 February 1991 (age 35)
- Place of birth: Tyseley, Birmingham, England
- Height: 6 ft 1 in (1.85 m)
- Position: Striker

Youth career
- 2006–2008: Aston Villa

Senior career*
Years	Team	Apps	(Gls)
2008–2014	Aston Villa	31	(2)
2011	→ Burnley (loan)	11	(1)
2012	→ Leicester City (loan)	4	(0)
2012–2013	→ Blackpool (loan)	41	(6)
2013–2014	→ Blackpool (loan)	11	(5)
2014	→ Coventry City (loan)	14	(3)
2014–2015	Blackpool	38	(3)
2015–2016	Blackburn Rovers	15	(1)
2016	→ Bury (loan)	4	(0)
2016–2017	Swindon Town	18	(1)
2017–2020	Blackpool	125	(24)
2020–2022	Bolton Wanderers	55	(6)
2022	→ Bradford City (loan)	6	(0)
2022–2023	Accrington Stanley	4	(0)
2023	AFC Fylde	7	(1)
2023–2024	Chorley	0	(0)
2024	Hednesford Town	5	(0)

International career^{‡}
2006–2007	England U16	8	(3)
2007–2008	England U17	4	(3)
2008–2010	England U19	25	(9)
2010–2012	England U21	18	(4)

Managerial career
- 2024: AFC Fylde (caretaker)
- * Club domestic league appearances and goals as of 17:40, 16 April 2024 (UTC) ‡ National team caps and goals as of 11:21, 21 March 2021 (UTC)

Nathan Abayomi Delfouneso (born 2 February 1991) is an English professional footballer who plays as a striker.

Having graduated from Aston Villa's academy Delfouneso broke into their first team in 2008, mainly being an impact substitute over the next few years, he scored 9 goals in 52 appearances, including two goals in the club's 2008-09 UEFA Cup campaign. Delfouneso had a series of loan moves to Football League Championship sides while at Aston Villa, followed by permanent spells at Blackpool, Blackburn Rovers and Swindon Town. He signed for Blackpool for a fourth time in 2017.

Delfouneso was a regular England youth international, playing a total of 54 matches and scoring 19 goals at U16, U17, U19 and U21 levels.

== Club career ==
=== Aston Villa ===
Born in Tyseley, Birmingham, Delfouneso, a product of the Aston Villa Academy, became a regular for both the club's reserve and academy teams in the 2006–07 season. He made his debut for the reserve team in March 2007, just a month after turning 16. His late goal gave Villa a 2–1 win against Portsmouth. In October, he scored his first goal in a 1–1 draw with Reading. In February 2008, Delfouneso signed his first professional contract with Aston Villa, a few days after he was given the number 14 shirt for the first team - it was later reported in French magazine Onze Mondial that the number was chosen due to Delfouneso's admiration of striker Thierry Henry. He travelled with the squad for the game at Fulham, but missed out on the final 16. By the end of the 2007–08 season, Delfouneso had made 41 appearances for the Academy team, scoring 22 goals in the process.

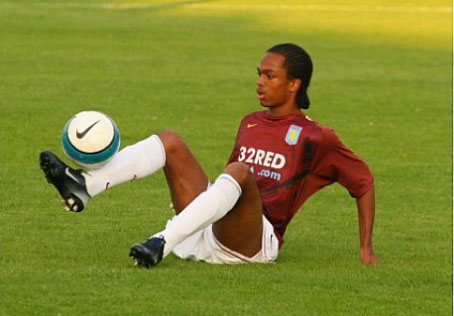
Delfouneso warming up for Aston Villa in 2008

Delfouneso made his competitive first-team début as a substitute in the away leg of the UEFA Cup second round match against Icelandic team FH Hafnarfjörður. This made Delfouneso the youngest player to represent Villa in European competition, at the age of 17 years and 195 days. He also came on in the second leg at Villa Park. He made his first competitive start in a UEFA Cup tie against MŠK Žilina, scoring with a left-footed volley after just half an hour. He scored again in his second start on 17 December, netting a consolation goal away at Hamburger SV.

Delfouneso made his first domestic senior appearance on 4 January 2009, in an FA Cup tie against Gillingham at Priestfield Stadium, which Villa won 2–1. He scored his first domestic senior goal a month later, on 4 February in an FA Cup fourth round replay against Doncaster Rovers at Villa Park, which Villa won 3–1. His performance was rewarded with high praise from boss Martin O'Neill. On 16 February, it was reported that Crystal Palace manager Neil Warnock was interested in taking Delfouneso to Selhurst Park on loan. O'Neill refused, declaring that Warnock's chances of acquiring the striker were "not a prayer". Delfouneso made his league debut against Tottenham Hotspur as a second-half substitute for Gabriel Agbonlahor, on 15 March. He was given a second run-out during Villa's 3–3 draw with Everton, creating two good chances for himself, but failed to score. On 13 May, Delfouneso ended the season by picking up both Villa's Players' Young Player of the Year and Supporters' Young Player of the Year. Eight days later, Delfouneso scored the opening goal in a 3–1 victory over Sunderland in the Premier Reserve League final.

On 6 November 2009, Delfouneso signed a new two-and-a-half-year contract with Aston Villa, keeping him at the club until the end of the 2011–12 season. In January 2010, O'Neill said that Delfouneso, along with fellow youngsters Marc Albrighton and Ciaran Clark, were the subject of many loan offers from various other clubs. However, he went on to emphasise his confidence that the trio were good enough to remain as vital squad members on the fringes of Aston Villa's first team. He scored his first league goal on 18 April, after coming off the bench against Portsmouth in a 2–1 victory at Fratton Park.

On 6 November 2010, Delfouneso started his first Premier League game against Fulham due to Emile Heskey, John Carew and Agbonlahor being injured. He completed 88 minutes of the match, which ended as a 1–1 draw. On 10 November, Delfouneso scored his second Premier League goal in a 3–2 win against Blackpool at Villa Park. By the end of this campaign for Villa, he made 16 appearances and scored two goals in all competitions.

The author Lee Child is a fan of Aston Villa; in his 17th book in the Jack Reacher series, A Wanted Man (2012), the naming of the fictional characters, FBI agents Karen Delfuenso and Julia Sorenson are hidden references to players Delfouneso and Thomas Sorenson.

On 20 May 2014, Aston Villa announced via their Twitter page that Delfouneso, along with Marc Albrighton, had been released from his contract and would be a free agent for the start of the 2014–15 season.

==== Loans to the Championship ====
On 8 March 2011, Delfouneso signed for Burnley of the Football League Championship until the end of the season. He made his debut the same day, playing at Hull City's KC Stadium. Delfouneso scored past on-loan Aston Villa teammate Brad Guzan just five minutes into his first start for The Clarets. On 23 January 2012, Delfouneso signed a one-month loan deal with Leicester City. He made five appearances for the Foxes, all as a substitute, but did not manage to score a goal.

On 31 August 2012, Delfouneso signed a one-year loan deal with Championship side Blackpool. He made his debut the following day as a 66th-minute substitute in a 1–0 defeat to Leicester City at the King Power Stadium. He scored his first goals for the club on 18 September, scoring twice in a 4–1 win against Middlesbrough. On 16 August 2013 it was confirmed that Delfouneso had re-signed on loan with Blackpool on a six-month deal. He played eleven league games in his second spell at Bloomfield Road, before returning to his parent club on 2 January 2014.

On 30 January 2014, Delfouneso joined Coventry City on loan for the remainder of the 2013–14 season. Delfouneso struggled for fitness during his spell and managed only two league goals in 14 appearances. His first came against Walsall in March, with his second and last goal for Coventry coming in a 2–1 defeat at Bramall Lane at the end of the 2013–14 season. He was also credited for a goal against Wolverhampton Wanderers that was later awarded as a Danny Batth own-goal.

=== Permanent return to Blackpool ===
After two previous loan spells at Bloomfield Road, Delfouneso signed a one-year contract with Blackpool, with the option of a second, in July 2014. He made his first start for the club in his new spell with them on 9 August. He was released in May 2015.

=== Blackburn Rovers, Bury (loan) and Swindon ===
On 6 August 2015, following Delfouneso's release from Blackpool, he signed for Blackburn Rovers on a one-year deal and was handed the number 7 shirt. On 11 August 2015, he scored his first Rovers goal with a header against Shrewsbury Town in a 2–1 defeat at Ewood Park in the Football League Cup first round. He also found the back of the net at Huddersfield on 15 August 2015, his second goal for the Rovers, in a Championship clash. On 18 March 2016, Delfouneso joined Bury on loan until 19 April.

On 18 August 2016, Delfouneso signed for Swindon Town until the end of the 2016–17 season.

=== Return to Blackpool ===
On 21 January 2017, Delfouneso re-joined Blackpool on a permanent deal for the second time and fourth time overall, signing a deal until the end of the 2016–17 campaign. His contract was extended by Blackpool at the end of the 2017–18 season after they exercised an option.

In May 2019 he signed a new two-year contract with Blackpool.

=== Bolton Wanderers ===
On 6 August 2020, Delfouneso joined Bolton Wanderers on a two-year deal. After scoring four goals in pre-season his competitive debut came on 5 September in Bolton's first match of the season, a 1–2 home defeat against Bradford in the first round of the EFL Cup. He scored his first competitive goal on 3 October, scoring Bolton's second goal in a 2–1 win against Harrogate Town.

On 31 January 2022, Delfouneso joined EFL League Two side Bradford City on loan for the remainder of the 2021–22 season. On 3 May, Bolton confirmed that he would be released at the end of his contract.

=== Accrington Stanley ===
On 20 September 2022, Delfouneso signed for League One club Accrington Stanley on a short-term contract. On 20 January 2023, Delfouneso left the club.

=== AFC Fylde ===
On 18 March 2023, Delfouneso signed for AFC Fylde on a short-term contract.

=== Hednesford Town ===
On 16 February 2024, he joined Hednesford Town along with four other players after a short spell with Chorley.

== International career ==
On the international scene, Delfouneso first came to notice playing for the England U16 team – collecting eight caps and scoring three goals during this period, two were scored in the 2006 Victory Shield. In October 2007, Delfouneso marked his debut for the England U17 team with a hat-trick in a 6–0 victory over Malta.

Delfouneso made his debut for the England U19 team on 8 October 2008 in a UEFA Championship Qualifying tie against Albania. The striker came on as an 18th-minute substitute and netted the second goal in a comfortable 3–0 victory. He added another brace to his tally in the semi-final match against France to put England through to the final of the 2009 UEFA Under-19 Championship.

On 22 February 2010, Delfouneso received his first call up to the England under-21 squad, On 3 March 2010, he scored on his debut for them against Greece in a 2–1 defeat.

Delfouneso was named in the final 18-man squad for the 2010 UEFA Under-19 Championship, which took place in France.

Delfouneso scored his second U-21 international goal against Iceland at Deepdale in a 2–1 friendly defeat in March 2011.

He scored his third goal for the England under-21 team on 5 September 2011 in a 4–1 win against Israel at Oakwell.

== Career statistics ==
As of match played 25 April 2023

Appearances and goals by club, season and competition
Club	Season	League			FA Cup		League Cup		Other		Total	
Club	Season	Division	Apps	Goals	Apps	Goals	Apps	Goals	Apps	Goals	Apps	Goals
Aston Villa	2008–09	Premier League	4	0	3	1	0	0	6 (Note: Appearances in UEFA Cup)	2	13	3
Aston Villa	2009–10	Premier League	9	1	3	2	1	0	0	0	13	3
Aston Villa	2010–11	Premier League	11	1	2	1	2	0	2 (Note: Appearances in UEFA Europa League)	0	17	2
Aston Villa	2011–12	Premier League	6	0	0	0	2	1	—		8	1
Aston Villa	2012–13	Premier League	1	0	—		0	0	—		1	0
Aston Villa	Total		31	2	8	4	5	1	8	2	52	9
Burnley (loan)	2010–11	Championship	11	1	—		—		—		11	1
Leicester City (loan)	2011–12	Championship	4	0	1	0	—		—		5	0
Blackpool (loan)	2012–13	Championship	41	6	2	1	—		—		43	7
Blackpool (loan)	2013–14	Championship	11	0	—		—		—		11	0
Blackpool (loan)	Total		52	6	2	1	0	0	—		54	7
Coventry City (loan)	2013–14	League One	14	3	—		—		—		14	3
Blackpool	2014–15	Championship	38	3	1	0	1	0	—		40	3
Blackburn Rovers	2015–16	Championship	15	1	0	0	1	1	—		16	2
Bury (loan)	2015–16	League One	4	0	—		—		—		4	0
Swindon Town	2016–17	League One	18	1	2	1	0	0	4 (Note: Appearance(s) in EFL Trophy)	1	24	3
Blackpool	2016–17	League Two	18	5	—		—		2 (Note: Appearances in League Two play-offs)	1	20	6
Blackpool	2017–18	League One	40	9	1	0	1	0	4	0	46	9
Blackpool	2018–19	League One	39	7	3	0	3	0	0	0	45	7
Blackpool	2019–20	League One	28	3	4	4	1	0	2	0	35	7
Blackpool	Total		125	24	8	4	5	0	8	1	146	29
Bolton Wanderers	2020–21	League Two	44	6	1	2	1	0	1	0	47	8
Bolton Wanderers	2021–22	League One	11	0	2	0	2	0	5	2	20	2
Bolton Wanderers	Total		55	6	3	2	3	0	6	2	67	10
Bradford City (loan)	2021–22	League Two	6	0	0	0	0	0	0	0	6	0
Accrington Stanley	2022–23	League One	4	0	1	0	0	0	2	0	7	0
Fylde	2022–23	National League North	7	1	—		—		—		7	1
Career total			384	48	26	12	15	2	28	6	453	68

== Honours ==
Aston Villa

- Football League Cup runner-up: 2009–10

Blackpool

- EFL League Two play-offs: 2017

England U16

- Victory Shield: 2006

England U19

- UEFA European Under-19 Championship runner-up: 2009

Individual

- Aston Villa Players' Young Player of the Year: 2008–09, 2009–10
- Aston Villa Supporters' Young Player of the Year: 2008–09, 2009–10
- UEFA European Under-19 Championship Golden Boot: 2009
