= Eric Lichaj =

American soccer player

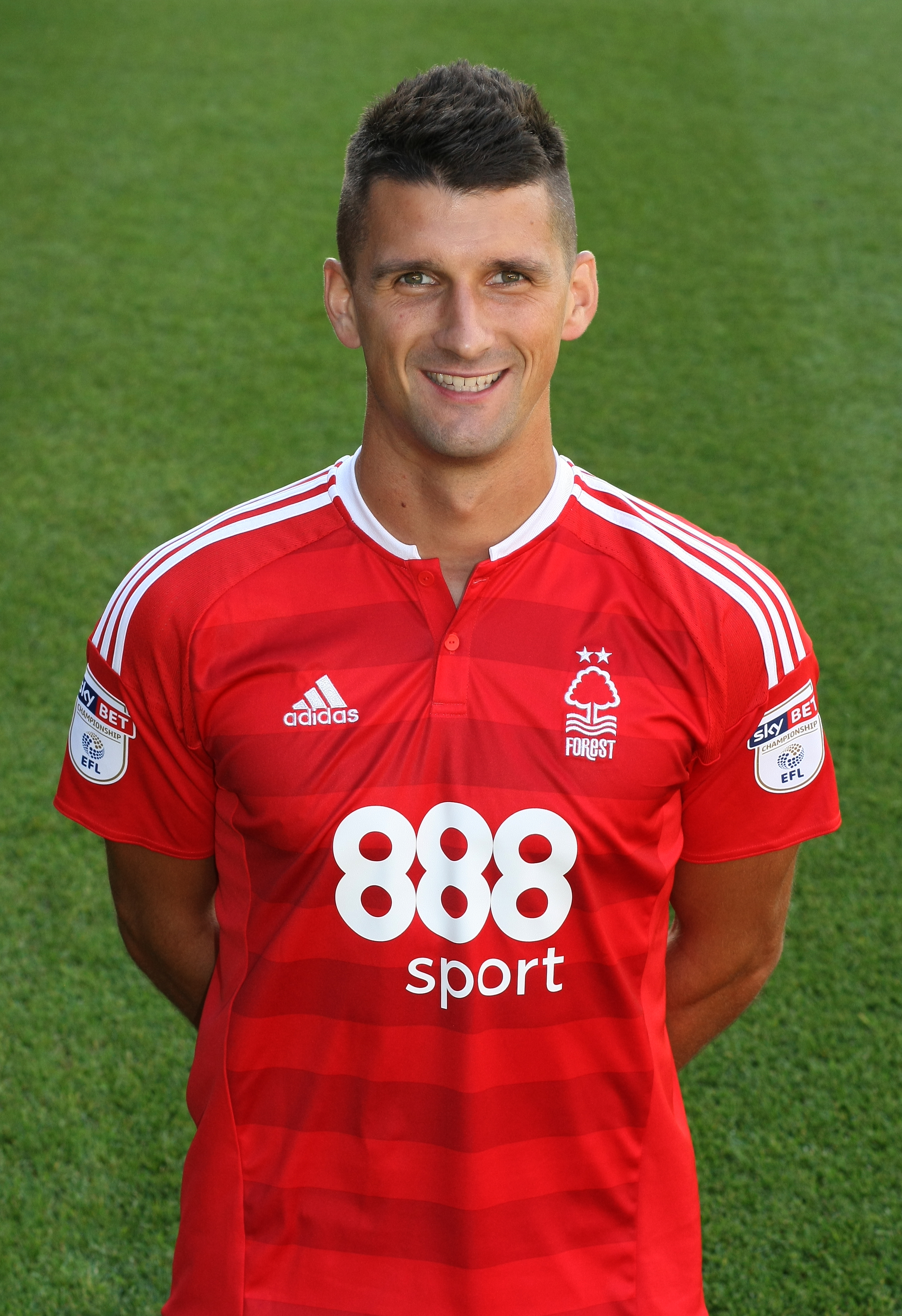
- Lichaj with Nottingham Forest in 2016

Personal information
- Full name: Eric Joseph Lichaj
- Date of birth: November 17, 1988 (age 38)
- Place of birth: Downers Grove, Illinois, United States
- Height: 5 ft 11 in (1.80 m)
- Position: Defender

Youth career
- 2003–2005: IMG Academy

College career
Years	Team	Apps	(Gls)
2006	North Carolina Tar Heels		

Senior career*
Years	Team	Apps	(Gls)
2006	Chicago Fire Premier	4	(0)
2007–2013	Aston Villa	32	(1)
2009	→ Lincoln City (loan)	6	(0)
2010	→ Leyton Orient (loan)	9	(1)
2011	→ Leeds United (loan)	16	(0)
2013–2018	Nottingham Forest	173	(4)
2018–2020	Hull City	68	(0)
2020–2021	Fatih Karagümrük	10	(0)
Total		318	(6)

International career^{‡}
2003–2005	United States U17	25	(0)
2006	United States U20	2	(0)
2010–2018	United States	16	(1)
Medal record
Representing United States
Runner-up	CONCACAF Gold Cup	2011
Winner	CONCACAF Gold Cup	2017
Men's Football
- * Club domestic league appearances and goals as of 12:47, December 6, 2020 (UTC) ‡ National team caps and goals as of 03:17, September 12, 2018 (UTC)

Eric Joseph Lichaj (/ˈliːhaɪ/ LEE-hy; born November 17, 1988) is an American former professional soccer player, who is currently the head coach of the FC Cincinnati U16 team.

Lichaj spent the majority of his professional soccer career in England, playing for Aston Villa, Nottingham Forest and Hull City.

== Club career ==
Eric Lichaj is the third son of Stan and Ann Lichaj, who were both from Nowy Targ, Poland. He has two older brothers, Andrew and Mark Lichaj. At the age of 14, Lichaj joined the soccer residency program at IMG Academy in Bradenton, Florida. He began his youth career with the Downers Grove Roadrunners, later played with Chicago Fire's youth side, and then spent one year at the University of North Carolina. He also played four games for the Chicago Fire Premier of the USL Premier Development League. After his freshman season, Lichaj signed with English Premier League club Aston Villa. Lichaj holds a Polish passport, making a work permit unnecessary.

=== Aston Villa ===
Following a season in the Aston Villa youth side, Lichaj featured in all but two of Villa's Reserve matches during the 2008–09 season. During the 2009–10 pre-season, he was selected for the 2009 Peace Cup squad and showed glimpses of his potential during the friendly tournament. This, however, did not immediately translate into playing time for the first team.

Lichaj was loaned out to League Two club Lincoln City to gain first-team experience. He played two games for Lincoln before signing a one-month loan extension. Later in the season, Lichaj again went on a month-long loan, this time to League One side Leyton Orient. He scored the first professional goal of his career for Leyton Orient against Stockport County on April 17, 2010.

Lichaj scored his first goal for Aston Villa on July 19, 2010, in a pre-season friendly against Peterborough United. Following a successful pre-season campaign, he signed a new three-year contract with the club on August 11, 2010. He made his competitive debut for Villa on August 19, 2010, in a 1–1 draw in a Europa League qualifying match away to Rapid Vienna. He made his Premier League debut for Aston Villa on November 10, 2010, against Blackpool. Lichaj made his first start for Aston Villa on December 11, 2010, in a 2–1 win against local rivals West Bromwich Albion. He also started for Villa at right back against Tottenham Hotspur, where he put in an impressive performance against in-form Spurs winger Gareth Bale.

==== Leeds United (loan) ====
On February 9, 2011, Lichaj joined Leeds United on a one-month loan deal. Lichaj made his Leeds debut in a 2–0 victory against Bristol City. On March 14, Leeds extended Lichaj's loan for the rest of the season. He scored an own goal in Leeds' match against Yorkshire rivals Sheffield United, who went on to win the match 2–0. After playing all of his games at right back in place of the injured Paul Connolly, Lichaj was moved to left back when George McCartney was injured. On May 9, Lichaj played the last game of his Leeds United loan spell in Leeds' 2–1 win over Queens Park Rangers. Leeds announced on their official website that Lichaj would be returning to his parent club Aston Villa at the end of his loan spell. After his loan expired, Lichaj said he wanted to rejoin Leeds the following season to help them earn promotion to the Premier League.

==== Back at Villa ====
After impressing during his loan spell, in July 2011 Leeds manager Simon Grayson said he was interested in re-signing Lichaj on loan as long as new Aston Villa manager Alex McLeish did not plan to use Lichaj in his first team. Lichaj scored his first goal for Aston Villa in their 2–0 win over Hereford United in the League Cup on August 23, 2011. On March 31, 2012, having already assisted Villa's first goal by throwing the ball long for James Collins to score from a header, Lichaj scored his first Premier League goal in a 4–2 defeat at home to Chelsea. After the 2012–13 Premier League season, Aston Villa decided not to renew Lichaj's contract, releasing him on a free transfer.

=== Nottingham Forest ===
Lichaj signed a two-year contract with Championship club Nottingham Forest on June 19, 2013. He made his debut in a 1–0 win against Huddersfield Town on the opening day of the season. In December 2014, he extended his deal until the summer of 2017. On October 20, 2015, Lichaj scored his first Nottingham Forest goal in a 1–1 draw with Burnley at the City Ground. Lichaj captained Forest for the first time on September 27, 2016, for a home game against Fulham and scored his second goal for the club in his next home game, opening the scoring in a 3–1 win over Birmingham City.

Following the sale of Henri Lansbury in January 2017 and the continued absence of regular captains such as Chris Cohen and Matt Mills, Lichaj continued to captain the side. He told local newspaper Nottingham Post he took "great pride" in the captaincy and that he had retained the armband from his first match as captain. At the end of the 2016–17 season, the club's fans named Lichaj Forest's Player of the Year, receiving over 40% of the vote.

In the third round of the 2017–18 FA Cup, Lichaj scored two goals in a 4–2 win over Arsenal, knocking the cup holders out of the competition. After the match, Lichaj stated his wife had promised to give him a dog if he scored a hat-trick in 2018.

=== Hull City ===
On June 22, 2018, Lichaj signed a two-year deal with Hull City for an undisclosed fee. He made his debut in the first match of the 2018–19 season on August 6, 2018, at home to Aston Villa in a 1–3 defeat. He was released by the team in 2020.

== International career ==
Lichaj has been involved with various U.S. youth teams. He helped the U.S. qualify for the 2005 FIFA U-17 World Championship and was named in the United States U-20 squad for the 2007 FIFA U-20 World Cup, although he missed out due to injury. He was called into the senior team as a "guest" for the camp preceding two World Cup qualifiers in June 2009. Lichaj received his first call-up to the United States senior team in October 2010 and was included in the squad for the friendlies against Poland and Colombia. Lichaj collected his first cap on October 12, 2010, in the friendly against Colombia. On November 17, 2010, Lichaj gained his second cap when he started for the U.S. against South Africa. On March 21, 2011, Lichaj received a call-up to the U.S. national side for the games against Argentina and Paraguay. He was named in the U.S. 2011 Gold Cup squad; after sitting on the bench for the first two Gold Cup matches, Lichaj played all 90 minutes of the last four, including the 4–2 loss in the final against Mexico.

In 2013, Lichaj returned to international duty after a two-year absence, making two substitute appearances for the U.S. against Scotland and Austria in November. In May 2016, Lichaj was again recalled by the U.S., as part of the preliminary Copa América Centenario roster, and for a friendly match against Puerto Rico, in which he appeared as a substitute.

During a 2017 Gold Cup quarterfinal match against El Salvador on July 19, 2017, Lichaj scored his first international goal to help the United States win 2–0.

== Career statistics ==
=== Club ===
As of March 31, 2022

Appearances and goals by club, season and competition
Club	Season	League			National cup (Note: Includes FA Cup and Turkish Cup)		League cup		Other		Total	
Club	Season	Division	Apps	Goals	Apps	Goals	Apps	Goals	Apps	Goals	Apps	Goals
Aston Villa	2008–09	Premier League	0	0	0	0	0	0	0	0	0	0
Aston Villa	2009–10	Premier League	0	0	0	0	0	0	0	0	0	0
Aston Villa	2010–11	Premier League	5	0	0	0	2	0	1 (Note: Appearance in UEFA Europa League)	0	8	0
Aston Villa	2011–12	Premier League	10	1	0	0	1	1	—		11	2
Aston Villa	2012–13	Premier League	17	0	2	0	4	0	—		23	0
Aston Villa	Total		32	1	2	0	7	1	1	0	42	2
Lincoln City (loan)	2009–10	League Two	6	0	0	0	0	0	0	0	6	0
Leyton Orient (loan)	2009–10	League One	9	1	0	0	0	0	0	0	9	1
Leeds United (loan)	2010–11	Championship	16	0	0	0	0	0	—		16	0
Nottingham Forest	2013–14	Championship	24	0	2	0	0	0	—		26	0
Nottingham Forest	2014–15	Championship	42	0	1	0	2	0	—		45	0
Nottingham Forest	2015–16	Championship	43	1	2	0	1	0	—		46	1
Nottingham Forest	2016–17	Championship	41	2	1	0	3	0	—		45	2
Nottingham Forest	2017–18	Championship	23	1	2	2	3	0	—		28	3
Nottingham Forest	Total		173	4	8	2	9	0	—		190	6
Hull City	2018–19	Championship	39	0	1	0	0	0	—		40	0
Hull City	2019–20	Championship	29	0	1	0	0	0	—		30	0
Hull City	Total		68	0	2	0	0	0	—		70	0
Fatih Karagümrük	2020–21	Süper Lig	10	0	2	0	0	0	0	0	12	0
Career total			314	6	14	2	16	1	1	0	346	9

=== International ===
As of September 11, 2018

Appearances and goals by national team and year
National team	Year	Apps	Goals
United States	2010	2	0
United States	2011	6	0
United States	2012	0	0
United States	2013	2	0
United States	2014	0	0
United States	2015	0	0
United States	2016	1	0
United States	2017	4	1
United States	2018	2	0
Total		16	1

Scores and results list the United States' goal tally first.

No	Date	Venue	Opponent	Score	Result	Competition
1.	July 19, 2017	Lincoln Financial Field, Philadelphia, United States	El Salvador	2–0	2–0	2017 CONCACAF Gold Cup

== Honors ==
United States

- CONCACAF Gold Cup: 2017
