= Chris Herd =

Australian soccer player (born 1989)

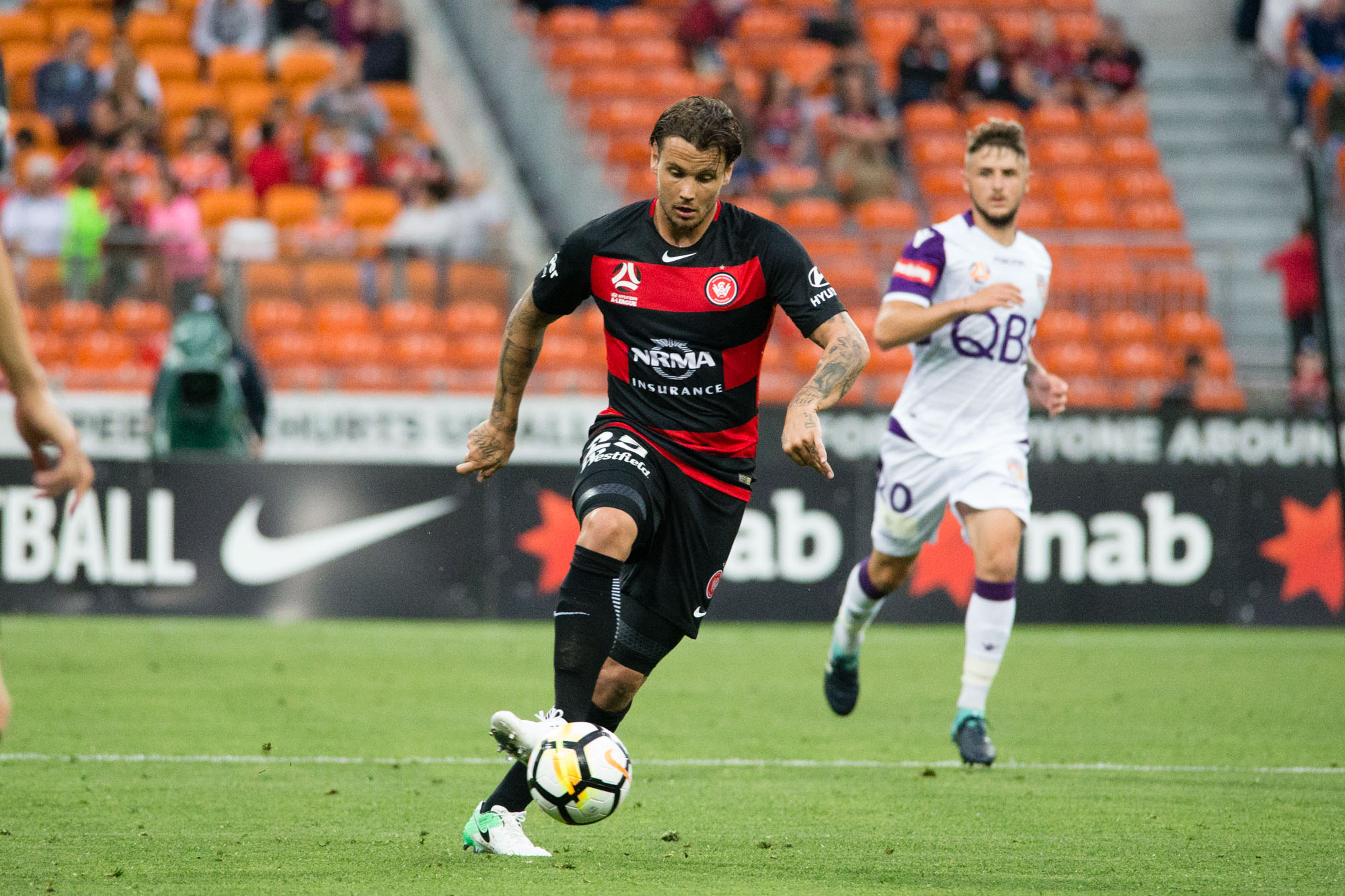
- Herd with Western Sydney Wanderers in 2017

Personal information
- Full name: Christopher Herd
- Date of birth: 4 April 1989 (age 37)
- Place of birth: Melbourne, Australia
- Height: 1.73 m (5 ft 8 in)
- Positions: Defender; midfielder

Youth career
- 2000–2004: ECU Joondalup
- 2004–2005: Bayswater City
- 2005–2010: Aston Villa

Senior career*
Years	Team	Apps	(Gls)
2010–2015	Aston Villa	36	(1)
2008	→ Port Vale (loan)	11	(2)
2008	→ Wycombe Wanderers (loan)	4	(0)
2009–2010	→ Lincoln City (loan)	20	(4)
2014	→ Bolton Wanderers (loan)	2	(0)
2015	→ Wigan Athletic (loan)	3	(0)
2015–2016	Chesterfield	23	(0)
2016	Perth Glory	0	(0)
2016–2017	Gillingham	12	(0)
2017–2018	Western Sydney Wanderers	9	(0)
2018	Buriram United	0	(0)
2018–2019	Chennaiyin	5	(0)
2019–2020	Sheikh Russel	6	(0)
2021	Terengganu	1	(0)
Total		132	(7)

International career
2009	Australia U20	2	(0)
2014	Australia	3	(0)
Medal record
Representing Australia
Men's Association football
AFC Asian Cup
Winner	2015 Australia
- * Club domestic league appearances and goals

Christopher Herd (born 4 April 1989) is an Australian former professional soccer player. Herd could be described as a utility player who was able to play in several positions, including central defence, full-back and central midfield. He represented Australia at under-20 level and won three caps with the Australia senior national team in 2014.

A graduate of the Aston Villa Academy, he was loaned from Aston Villa out to Port Vale and Wycombe Wanderers in 2008, before spending the 2009–10 campaign on loan at Lincoln City. He made his Premier League debut in November 2010 and became a regular first-team player in the 2011–12 season. He was largely absent from the first-team for the next two seasons. He was loaned out to Bolton Wanderers in September 2014 and then Wigan Athletic in January 2015. He signed with Chesterfield in September 2015 before signing a deal to join Australian side Perth Glory in April 2016; however, he decided to terminate the contract for family reasons and signed for Gillingham in October 2016. Following a spell with Western Sydney Wanderers, he signed with Thai club Buriram United in June 2018. He joined Indian club Chennaiyin in January 2019. In December 2019, he joined Bangladesh Premier League team Sheikh Russel and 12 months later signed for Malaysian club Terengganu FC.

== Club career ==
=== Aston Villa ===
Born in Melbourne and raised in Perth, Western Australia, Herd started his youth career at ECU Joondalup, and frequently trained with English club Southampton, which had close links to Joondalup. However, Southampton decided that he was too small. Joondalup released him at the age of 14. Herd signed for Aston Villa from Australian club Bayswater City SC in February 2005, along with fellow Australian Shane Lowry, initially in a deal that was made up of a two-year Youth Training Scheme followed by him signing a one-year professional contract with the club. He made 19 appearances and scored twice for Aston Villa Reserves during his Youth Training Scheme campaign, as well as 21 appearances and one goal for the academy. Herd was also part of the squad that won the HKFC Philips Lighting International Soccer Sevens in May 2007 and was rewarded with a two-year contract following the success. He played in various positions in his early career, most notably in central midfield and on the right wing. However, he was heavily deployed at right-back in the 2007–08 Reserve season. In July 2008, Herd was awarded with a new two-year deal. On 17 December 2008, he was selected on the bench for Villa's UEFA Cup match against Hamburger SV in Germany.

In January 2008, Herd signed on a one-month loan deal (subsequently extended) for Port Vale, and made his debut in the following match against Millwall. Herd received the first red card of his career in early February 2008, as Vale lost to Bristol Rovers. On his return to the team after suspension he scored two early goals in the 3–2 defeat to Hartlepool United on 12 February. After returning from Vale Park, Herd then signed a one-month loan deal with Wycombe Wanderers in March 2008, with Wycombe needing to strengthen their midfield numbers following injuries and a suspension. Herd started three matches and made a substitute appearance in another, to play a total of four games during his spell. He returned to Villa after being left on the bench for the match against Grimsby Town on 15 April.

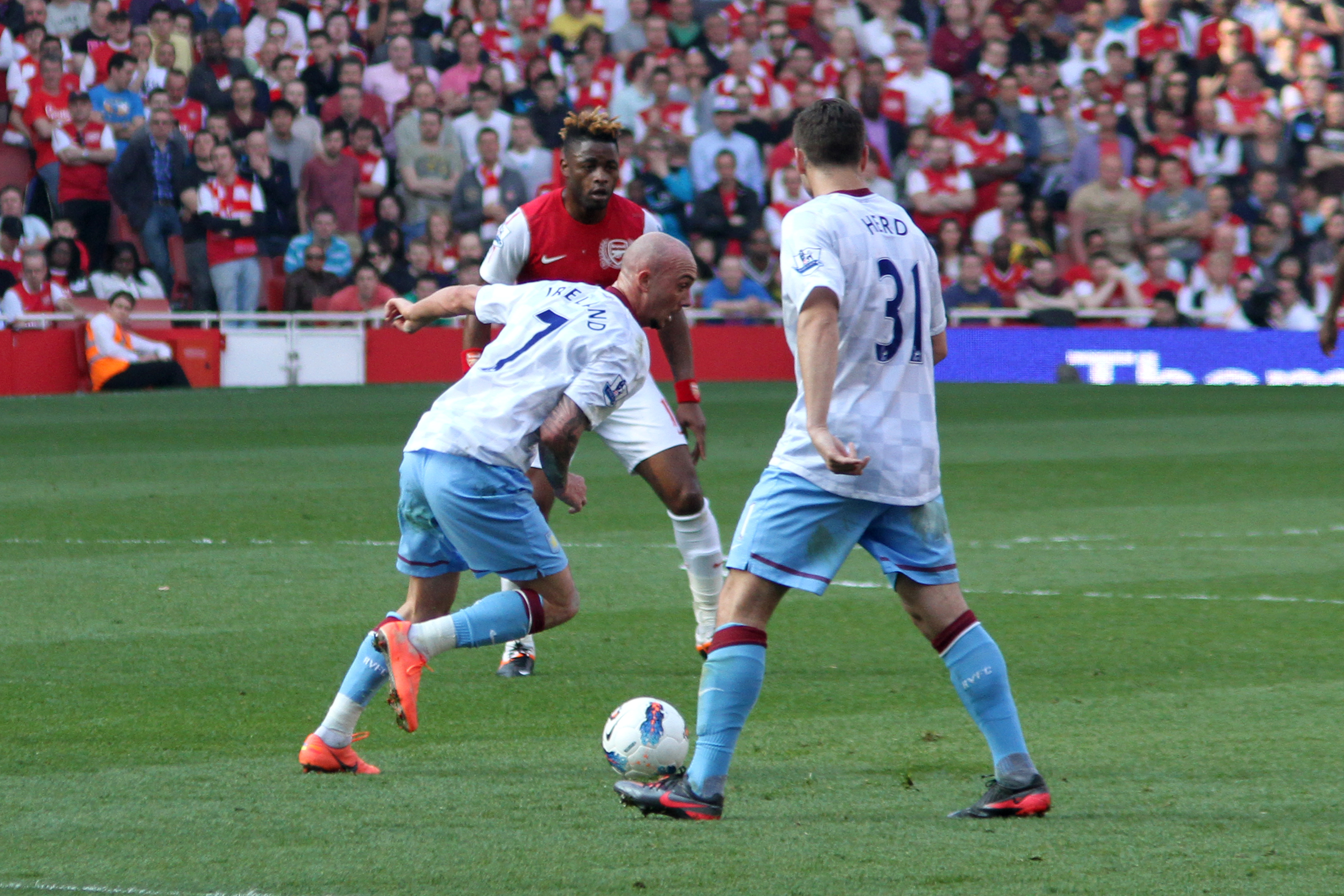
Herd (right) playing for Aston Villa in 2012.

Herd featured for Villa's first-team during Villa's pre-season for the 2009–10 season, and despite missing a penalty in the shoot-out with Juventus in the Peace Cup final, he still finished on the winning side in 2009. On 27 November 2009, Villa allowed Herd to join League Two side Lincoln City on loan until the new year. Villa permitted him to play in the FA Cup, clearing the way for him to make his Lincoln City debut against Northwich Victoria two days after joining. Herd scored his first Lincoln goal in a 3–1 defeat to Rochdale on 12 December. Having established himself in the first XI, Herd extended his loan with the "Imps" until the end of the season.

Through the previous season's loan stint, Herd became a very popular player among "Imps" fans, and he almost rejoined the club in August 2010, although the season-long loan fell through at the last minute. This allowed him to make his Aston Villa Premier League debut against Manchester United on 13 November 2010, when he came on as a late substitute in the 2–2 draw at Villa Park. On 21 November, he made a substitute appearance by coming on in the 81st minute for midfielder Jonathan Hogg in a 2–0 defeat to Blackburn Rovers at Ewood Park. A week later, he came off the bench late into a 4–2 loss to Arsenal at Villa Park. On 10 January 2011, Herd scored a hat-trick as the Aston Villa reserves recorded a 10–1 victory over Arsenal reserves. In January 2011 he signed a contract extension with Villa, tying him to the club until 2014. Herd made his first start for the "Villans" in a 3–0 defeat to Manchester City in the FA Cup fifth round. Due to the injuries and suspensions of a few senior defenders at Villa, Herd then followed this making his first Premier League start for Villa, lining up in at right-back, in the match against local rivals, Wolverhampton Wanderers at Molineux on 19 March. At the end of the 2010–11 season, Herd made seven appearances in all competitions.

He played as a right-back against Wolverhampton Wanderers in his first Premier League game of the 2011–12; his performance earned him the man of the match award and special praise from boss Alex McLeish. He came back into the side for the home game against West Bromwich Albion on 22 October, playing in a defensive midfield role. However, he was controversially sent off by referee Phil Dowd for an alleged stamp on Jonas Olsson in the 36th minute. Villa manager Alex McLeish defended the young defender, maintaining that he had "done nothing wrong". However, Jonas Olsson insisted that Herd kicked out and deserved his dismissal. It was confirmed two days later, on 24 October, that Aston Villa had appealed the decision. The appeal was successful, and the suspension quashed. In December 2011, Herd had signed a new four-year contract, keeping him at Villa Park until 2015. He scored his first top-flight goal in a 1–1 draw with Liverpool at Anfield on 7 April. On 2 May, he was recorded on video taking part in an early morning "nightclub brawl", along with team-mates James Collins and Fabian Delph. He said that his actions "were out of character", and was forced to pay a club fine as manager Alex McLeish called the incident a "slur on the club".

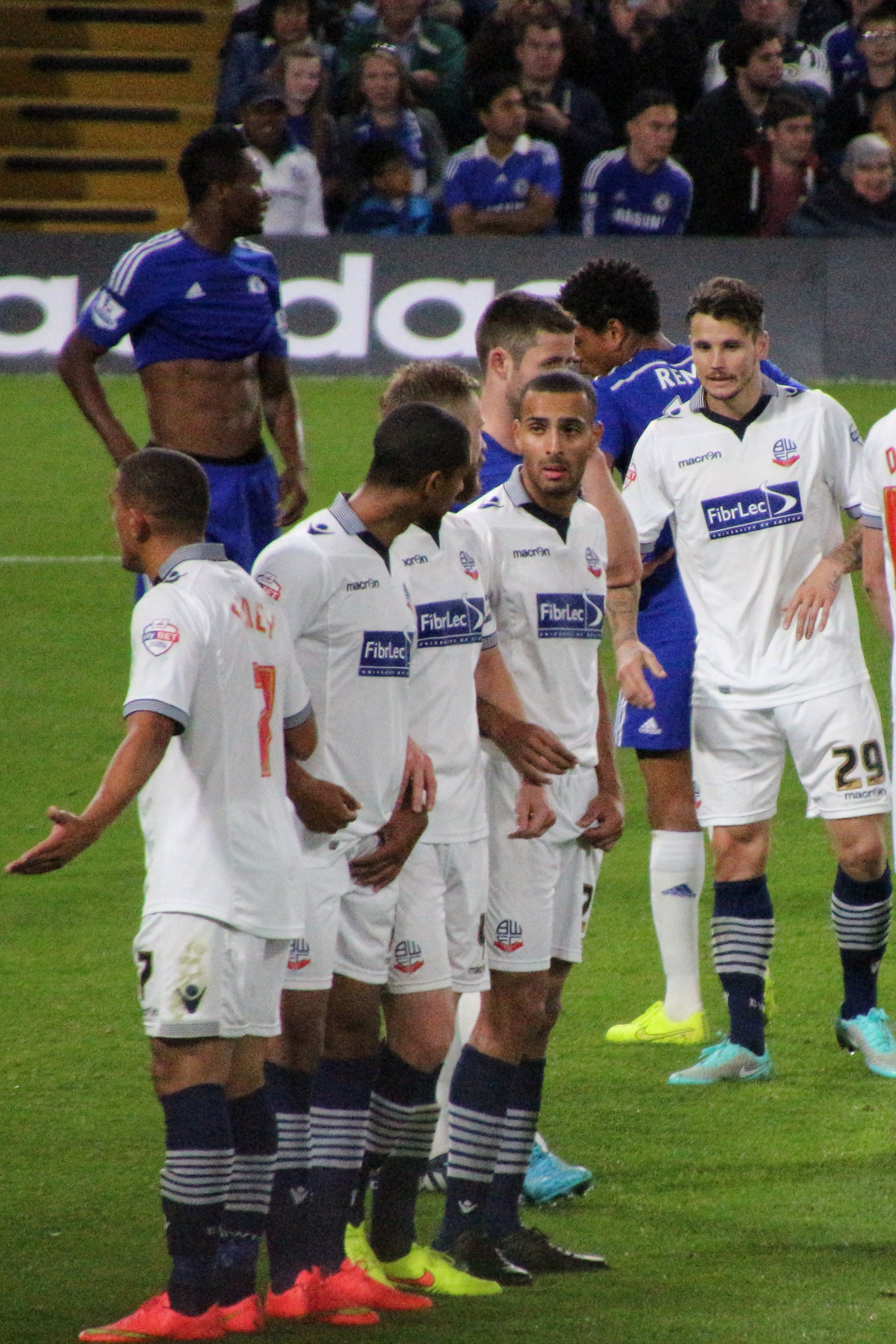
Herd (wearing No.29) on his début on loan to Bolton Wanderers against Chelsea in the League Cup in 2014

Herd scored his second goal for Villa in a League Cup win over Tranmere Rovers on 28 August 2012. He ended the 2012–13 campaign with 13 appearances to his name. However, he featured twice in the 2013–14 season before the club announced that he would be unavailable indefinitely for 'personal reasons' in March 2014.

He returned to Villa at the start of 2014–15 season after spending some months training with his father in Birmingham. On 23 September 2014, he joined Championship side Bolton Wanderers on a one-month loan. The following day he made his debut for the "Trotters" at right-back in their 2–1 League Cup defeat to Chelsea at Stamford Bridge. His time with the "Trotters" was blighted by injury and after only three appearances at the Macron Stadium he returned to Villa with Wanderers manager Neil Lennon stating he was unwilling to extend the loan spell while Herd's fitness was in doubt. After pulling out of the Australian squad due to an Achilles injury picked up in a training session, he returned to the Championship by joining struggling Wigan Athletic; manager Malky Mackay stated that "I feel that his energy, his athleticism and his tenacity will be things that can really help us out". However, his loan was cut early a month later as he required surgery for a season ending medial ligament injury. He was released in the summer by Villa manager Tim Sherwood.

=== Later career ===
Herd signed a four-month contract with League One side Chesterfield in September 2015. In January, he signed a contract to keep him with the "Spireites" until the end of the 2015–16 season.

On 28 April 2016, Herd signed with Australian A-League side Perth Glory. However, three months later his contract with Perth Glory was terminated by mutual agreement due to him not managing to relocate his family to Perth.

Herd signed a one-year contract with League One side Gillingham in October 2016. He made 14 appearances across the 2016–17 campaign, and was released by manager Adrian Pennock in May 2017.

Herd returned to Australia and signed a two-year contract with Tony Popovic's Western Sydney Wanderers in July 2017. He made his league debut for Wanderers in Round 1, a 2–1 victory over former club Perth Glory at the Sydney Showground Stadium. He appeared 12 times throughout the 2017–18 season before he left the club by mutual consent on 12 April 2018.

On 28 June 2018, Herd signed with Thai League 1 champions Buriram United. However, he did not make any appearances during the 2018 season. He left the club at the end of the campaign.

On 1 February 2019, Herd joined Indian Super League side Chennaiyin on a deal to run until the end of the 2018–19 season. In December 2019 he joined Bangladesh Premier League team Sheikh Russel. The 2019–20 season was ended early and declared null and void due to the COVID-19 pandemic in Bangladesh; Herd went on to leave the Sylhet District Stadium after coming to a financial agreement with the club in June 2020.

Herd signed with Malaysia Super League club Terengganu FC in December 2020. He played one game for the club in April 2021.

== International career ==
Herd was selected in Australia's final under-20 Squad for the 2009 FIFA Under-20 World Cup in Egypt.

As both of his parents are Scottish, Herd was eligible to represent Scotland. In September 2011, his agent Darren Jackson and former agent Phil Williams confirmed that Scotland manager Craig Levein was aware of this and had been following the player's development. His father Willie said he had encouraged his son to play for Scotland, but that he was likely to reject any approaches in favour of continuing to represent Australia.

He received his first call-up to the Australia senior squad in November 2011, when he was selected for the World Cup Qualification matches against Oman and Thailand, but had to withdraw from the squad because of injury. He was called up again in August 2012. However, he was forced to withdraw from the squad due to a quadriceps strain. He later revealed that he had fallen out with head coach Holger Osieck and had to wait until Ange Postecoglou took charge before returning to the side. Herd made his debut for Australia in a friendly against Belgium on 4 September 2014.

Herd was named as part of Australia's squad for the 2015 AFC Asian Cup. However, Herd injured his Achilles tendon in a training session before the match against Oman, ruling him out for the remainder of the tournament. Australia went on to win the tournament for the first time after beating South Korea in the final.

== Career statistics ==
=== Club ===
Appearances and goals by club, season and competition
Club	Season	League			National cup (Note: Includes FA Cup, Australia Cup, Thai FA Cup, AIFF Super Cup, Federation Cup, Malaysia FA Cup, Malaysia Cup)		League cup (Note: Includes Football League Cup, Thai League Cup)		Other		Total	
Club	Season	Division	Apps	Goals	Apps	Goals	Apps	Goals	Apps	Goals	Apps	Goals
Aston Villa	2007–08	Premier League	0	0	0	0	0	0	—		0	0
Aston Villa	2008–09	Premier League	0	0	0	0	0	0	0	0	0	0
Aston Villa	2009–10	Premier League	0	0	0	0	0	0	0	0	0	0
Aston Villa	2010–11	Premier League	6	0	1	0	0	0	0	0	7	1
Aston Villa	2011–12	Premier League	19	1	0	0	1	0	—		20	1
Aston Villa	2012–13	Premier League	9	0	0	0	4	1	—		13	1
Aston Villa	2013–14	Premier League	2	0	0	0	0	0	—		2	0
Aston Villa	2014–15	Premier League	0	0	0	0	0	0	—		0	0
Aston Villa	Total		36	1	1	0	5	1	0	0	42	2
Port Vale (loan)	2007–08	League One	11	2	—		—		—		11	2
Wycombe Wanderers (loan)	2007–08	League Two	4	0	—		—		—		4	0
Lincoln City (loan)	2009–10	League Two	20	4	2	0	—		—		22	4
Bolton Wanderers (loan)	2014–15	Championship	2	0	0	0	1	0	—		3	0
Wigan Athletic (loan)	2014–15	Championship	3	0	—		—		—		3	0
Chesterfield	2015–16	League One	23	0	1	0	—		—		24	0
Perth Glory	2016–17	A-League	0	0	0	0	—		0	0	0	0
Gillingham	2016–17	League One	12	0	1	0	—		1 (Note: Appearance in the EFL Trophy.)	0	14	0
Western Sydney Wanderers	2017–18	A-League	9	0	3	0	—		0	0	12	0
Buriram United	2018	Thai League 1	0	0	0	0	0	0	0	0	0	0
Chennaiyin	2018–19	Indian Super League	5	0	0	0	—		0	0	5	0
Sheikh Russel	2019–20	Bangladesh Premier League	6	0	0	0	—		0	0	6	0
Terengganu FC	2021	Malaysia Super League	1	0	0	0	—		0	0	1	0
Career total			132	7	8	0	6	1	1	0	147	8

=== International ===
Appearances and goals by national team and year
National team	Year	Apps	Goals
Australia	2014	3	0
Total		3	0

== Honours ==
Australia

- AFC Asian Cup: 2015
