= Luke Young (footballer, born 1979) =

English footballer (born 1979)

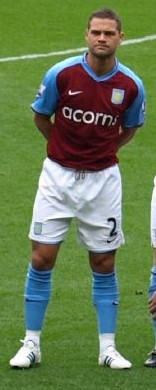
- Young lining up for Aston Villa in 2008

Personal information
- Full name: Luke Paul Young
- Date of birth: 19 July 1979 (age 47)
- Place of birth: Harlow, England
- Height: 5 ft 11 in (1.80 m)
- Position: Defender

Senior career*
Years	Team	Apps	(Gls)
1997–2001	Tottenham Hotspur	58	(0)
2001–2007	Charlton Athletic	187	(4)
2007–2008	Middlesbrough	35	(1)
2008–2011	Aston Villa	75	(2)
2011–2014	Queens Park Rangers	24	(2)
Total		379	(9)

International career
1998	England U18	5	(0)
1999–2002	England U21	16	(1)
2005	England	7	(0)
- * Club domestic league appearances and goals

Luke Paul Young (born 19 July 1979) is an English former professional footballer who played as a defender.

Young began his career at Tottenham Hotspur in 1997, before moving to Charlton Athletic in 2001, where he spent six seasons. He then had stints at Middlesbrough and Aston Villa before moving to Queens Park Rangers in 2011. He played 379 career league matches, and all but one of them in the Premier League. Young represented the England national team on seven occasions in 2005.

== Early life ==
Young was born in Harlow, Essex, and has an older brother, Neil Young, who was also a professional footballer and most notably played for AFC Bournemouth. During Neil's testimonial match, he captained the Bournemouth team and brother Luke captained the opponents Charlton Athletic. The final score was a 5–2 win for Charlton.

Luke's 17-year-old half-brother, Andre Young, was found dead on 12 August 2009 whilst on holiday in Malia, Crete, after sustaining head injuries. Young said at the time: "He was a tremendous and talented person and a diligent student and this is such a waste of a promising life." In November 2011, British authorities recorded an open verdict on the cause of death.

Luke's youngest brother, Jake Young, played for West Ham United's academy as a midfielder.

== Club career ==
=== Tottenham Hotspur ===
Young started his career with Tottenham Hotspur's youth system and signed a professional contract on 3 July 1997. George Graham gave him his first-team debut on 28 November 1998, playing the full 90 minutes of a 2–1 loss at West Ham, alongside Sol Campbell in the centre of defence. He hit a 25-yard volley which was saved by Shaka Hislop. Young made appearances in the 1998–99 League Cup, but was an unused substitute for the final at Wembley Stadium, which Tottenham won 1–0 against Leicester City on 21 March 1999. He was also present in the team's run through the rounds of the FA Cup, in which they lost after extra time to Newcastle United in the semi-finals.

=== Charlton Athletic ===
Young transferred to Charlton Athletic on 25 July 2001 on a four-year contract for an initial £3 million fee, adding £250,000 at the end of each of the first four seasons in which Charlton remained in the Premier League. He made his debut on 18 August 2001, in a 2–1 home loss to Everton. In his first season at the Valley, he played alongside Mark Fish, Jorge Costa and Jonathan Fortune in a defence whose last names combined to 'Young Fish Cost a Fortune'.

On 25 August 2004, Young scored the first goal of his career, assisted by Dennis Rommedahl to conclude a 3–0 home win over Aston Villa. He followed this on 18 September 2004 when he exploited an error by goalkeeper Maik Taylor to open a 1–1 draw at Birmingham City. In the spring of 2005, he was voted Player of the Year by the Charlton fans.

Before Alan Curbishley left Charlton, Young had handed in a transfer request, since he and Curbishley had not got on. After Curbishley left, Young withdrew his transfer request, but after Iain Dowie was appointed manager he reinstated it, citing the club not offering him a new contract even though he only had a year left on his existing contract. On 2 June 2006, Young was offered a new three-year deal at the Valley. On 19 July 2006, Young signed a new four-year contract at Charlton. However, Charlton finished 19th in the Premier League in the 2006–07 season, and were relegated into the Championship. Young requested a transfer, which was accepted.

=== Middlesbrough ===
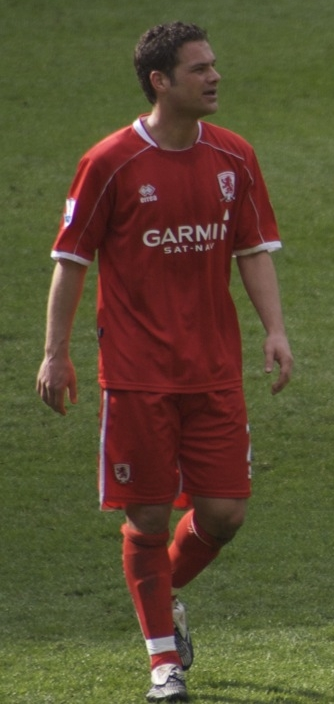
Young playing for Middlesbrough in 2008

Young was signed by Premier League club Middlesbrough for a £2.5 million fee on a four-year contract in July 2007. He made his debut for Middlesbrough against Newcastle. His first goal for Middlesbrough, a long-distance drive into the top corner, came against his former club Tottenham at the Riverside Stadium in a Premier League match on 3 November 2007, with the match ending in a 1–1 draw.

=== Aston Villa ===
On 7 August 2008, Aston Villa signed Young for a fee that could reach £6 million, on a three-year contract. Young made his Villa debut in their opening day Premier League fixture against Manchester City, which they won 4–2. He scored his first goal for the club in a 3–2 home victory over Blackburn Rovers, finding the net from close range on the second attempt, an important equaliser on the stroke of half-time. After some solid performances at right back in the early part of 2008–09, Young became a fans' favourite amongst the Villa supporters. A long-term injury to first-choice left back Wilfred Bouma meant that Young switched to the left side of defence to cover Bouma's absence during 2008–09.

In 2009–10, Young did not play as much first-team football as he did in the previous season, which was partly because Martin O'Neill preferred to play Carlos Cuéllar at right back. In July 2010, Liverpool and Villa agreed a fee of £2.5 million for Young, but he turned down the offer. He later revealed why he turned down the chance to move to Liverpool, saying he "had more chance of getting in the first team at Villa than I did getting in the first team at Liverpool" and "I just had the underlying feeling that I was going there as kind of a back-up for left back and right back".

Young was a regular in the starting line-up at the beginning of 2010–11 and scored his second goal for the club in a 1–0 win over Everton on 29 August 2010.

=== Queens Park Rangers ===
On 27 August 2011, Young joined Premier League club Queens Park Rangers on a three-year contract for an undisclosed fee. He scored his first goal for the club on 19 November in QPR's 3–2 win against Stoke City, but went on to suffer an injury later in the same match.

After featuring regularly in the R's defence in his first season, his second season saw a change, with Mark Hughes freezing him out of the Premier League squad for the 2012–13 season. With Hughes' dismissal in November 2012, new manager Harry Redknapp suggested that Young may still have a future at the club. However, he failed to recover from an injury in time to be included in the 25-man squad submitted on 1 February 2013, raising doubts about his future.

Young made his first league appearance for QPR for almost two years against Blackburn on 8 April 2014. He was released by QPR at the end of 2013–14.

== International career ==
In May 2005, Young was called up for the first time to the England team for their tour of the United States, after the injury withdrawal of Gary Neville. He made his debut on 28 May against the United States in Chicago, as a substitute for Andy Johnson with 14 minutes to play of the 2–1 win. Due to another Neville injury, his first full appearance in an England shirt came on 3 September 2005, when he played the full 90 minutes in the World Cup qualifying match against Wales, which England won 1–0.

Young was put on standby for Sven-Göran Eriksson's 2006 World Cup squad, but withdrew with an ankle injury and was replaced by Michael Dawson. On 21 March 2007, Steve McClaren drafted Young into the England team for the qualifiers against Israel and Andorra because of injuries to Micah Richards and Jonathan Woodgate.

In total Young played for his country seven times, his final cap coming against Argentina in November 2005. He was also called up by Fabio Capello, but he did not play for him either. His final appearance in an England squad was for the friendly against Spain in February 2009.

On 11 November 2009, it emerged that Young had, in February 2009, made his unavailability for future international duties known to The Football Association on personal grounds. This retirement from international football was made public when Young rejected an offer to reverse his decision following the injury of Glen Johnson before a match against Brazil.

== Career statistics ==
=== Club ===
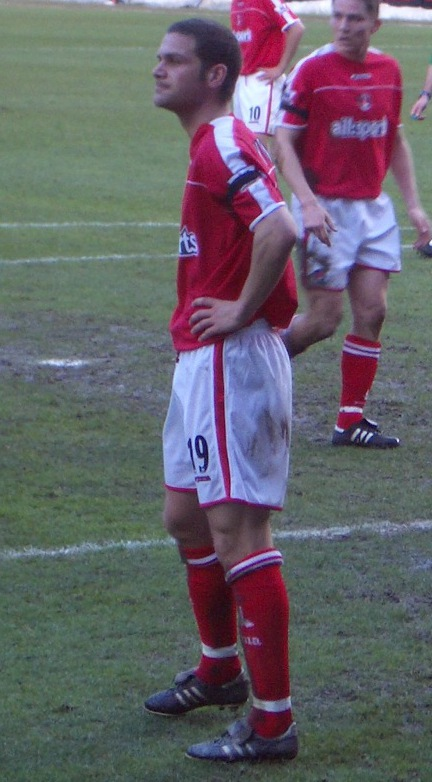
Young playing for Charlton Athletic in 2004

Appearances and goals by club, season and competition
Club	Season	League			FA Cup		League Cup		Europe		Total	
Club	Season	Division	Apps	Goals	Apps	Goals	Apps	Goals	Apps	Goals	Apps	Goals
Tottenham Hotspur	1998–99	Premier League	15	0	5	0	2	0	—		22	0
Tottenham Hotspur	1999–2000	Premier League	20	0	2	0	1	0	3 (Note: Appearances in UEFA Cup)	0	26	0
Tottenham Hotspur	2000–01	Premier League	23	0	4	0	1	0	—		28	0
Tottenham Hotspur	Total		58	0	11	0	4	0	3	0	76	0
Charlton Athletic	2001–02	Premier League	34	0	1	0	3	0	—		38	0
Charlton Athletic	2002–03	Premier League	32	0	2	0	0	0	—		34	0
Charlton Athletic	2003–04	Premier League	24	0	0	0	1	0	—		25	0
Charlton Athletic	2004–05	Premier League	36	2	3	0	2	0	—		41	2
Charlton Athletic	2005–06	Premier League	32	1	3	0	3	0	—		38	1
Charlton Athletic	2006–07	Premier League	29	1	0	0	3	0	—		32	1
Charlton Athletic	Total		187	4	9	0	12	0	—		208	4
Middlesbrough	2007–08	Premier League	35	1	5	0	2	0	—		42	1
Aston Villa	2008–09	Premier League	34	1	2	0	0	0	7	0	43	1
Aston Villa	2009–10	Premier League	16	0	3	0	1	0	0	0	20	0
Aston Villa	2010–11	Premier League	23	1	0	0	1	0	0	0	24	1
Aston Villa	2011–12	Premier League	2	0	—		0	0	—		2	0
Aston Villa	Total		75	2	5	0	2	0	7	0	89	2
Queens Park Rangers	2011–12	Premier League	23	2	3	0	—		—		26	2
Queens Park Rangers	2012–13	Premier League	0	0	0	0	0	0	—		0	0
Queens Park Rangers	2013–14	Championship	1	0	0	0	0	0	0	0	1	0
Queens Park Rangers	Total		24	2	3	0	0	0	0	0	27	2
Career total			379	9	33	0	20	0	10	0	442	9

=== International ===
Appearances and goals by national team and year
National team	Year	Apps	Goals
England	2005	7	0
Total		7	0

== Honours ==
Tottenham Hotspur

- Football League Cup: 1998–99

Aston Villa

- Football League Cup runner-up: 2009–10

Individual

- Charlton Athletic Player of the Year: 2004–05
