= 2006–07 Charlton Athletic F.C. season =

Charlton Athletic
2006–07 season
- Manager: Iain Dowie (until November); Les Reed (from November to December); Alan Pardew (from December)
- Stadium: The Valley
- FA Premier League: 19th (relegated)
- FA Cup: Third round
- League Cup: Quarter-finals
- Top goalscorer: League: Darren Bent (13); All: Darren Bent (15)
- Highest home attendance: 27,111 (vs. Chelsea, Liverpool, West Ham United and Sheffield United)
- Lowest home attendance: 23,423 (vs. Blackburn Rovers, 5 December 2006
- Average home league attendance: 26,195
Home colours	Away colours

During the 2006–07 English football season, Charlton Athletic competed in the FA Premier League. The club also competed in the FA Cup, and the League Cup. The season covered the period from 1 July 2006 to 30 June 2007.

== Season summary ==
Following Alan Curbishley's resignation after 10 years in charge of the Addicks, Northern Irishman Iain Dowie was snared from South London rivals Crystal Palace who were relegated in the previous season, but, despite being given more money to spend in the transfer market than any other previous Charlton manager, the club were in the relegation zone for most of his tenure and he was sacked in November. First-team coach Les Reed stepped into the breach, but also proved unsuitable for the job and was in turn replaced by former West Ham United manager Alan Pardew. Pardew was unable to stop the rot and after seven years in the top-flight, Charlton were relegated.

== Kit ==
Spanish apparel manufacturers Joma remained the suppliers with Spanish real estate company Llanera remains Shirt Sponsors.

== Final league table ==
Pos	Team	Pld	W	D	L	GF	GA	GD	Pts	Qualification or relegation
16	Fulham	38	8	15	15	38	60	−22	39	
17	Wigan Athletic	38	10	8	20	37	59	−22	38	
18	Sheffield United (R)	38	10	8	20	32	55	−23	38	Relegation to Football League Championship
19	Charlton Athletic (R)	38	8	10	20	34	60	−26	34	Relegation to Football League Championship
20	Watford (R)	38	5	13	20	29	59	−30	28	Relegation to Football League Championship

Source: Premier League
Rules for classification: 1) points; 2) goal difference; 3) number of goals scored.
(R) Relegated

== Kit ==
Charlton retained their kit manufacturing deal with Spanish apparel manufacturers Joma, who produced a new kit for the season. The kit sponsorship deal with Spanish real estate company Llanera.

== Players ==
=== First-team squad ===
Squad at end of season

Note: Flags indicate national team as defined under FIFA eligibility rules; some limited exceptions apply. Players may hold more than one non-FIFA nationality.

No.	Pos.	Nation	Player
2	DF	ENG	Luke Young (captain)
3	DF	ISL	Hermann Hreiðarsson
4	MF	SEN	Amdy Faye
5	MF	IRL	Andy Reid
6	DF	BUL	Radostin Kishishev
7	FW	ENG	Marcus Bent
8	MF	IRL	Matt Holland (Note: Holland was born in Bury, England, but qualified to represent the Republic of Ireland internationally through his grandmother and made his debut for Republic of Ireland in 1999.)
9	MF	CHN	Zheng Zhi (on loan from Shandong Luneng)
10	FW	ENG	Darren Bent
11	MF	ENG	Darren Ambrose
12	FW	JAM	Kevin Lisbie (Note: Lisbie was born in Hackney, England, but also qualified to represent Jamaica internationally and made his international debut for Jamaica in 2002.)
14	MF	ENG	Jerome Thomas
15	DF	MAR	Talal El Karkouri
16	MF	CMR	Alex Song (on loan from Arsenal)

No.	Pos.	Nation	Player
18	FW	NED	Jimmy Floyd Hasselbaink (Note: Hasselbaink was born in Paramaribo, Suriname, but was raised in the Netherlands from the age of 6 and made his international debut for the Netherlands in May 1998.)
19	MF	DEN	Dennis Rommedahl
20	MF	ENG	Bryan Hughes
22	DF	ALG	Madjid Bougherra (Note: Bougherra was born in Longvic, France, but also qualified to represent Algeria internationally through his grandfather and represented them at U-23 level before making his international debut for Algeria in June 2004.)
23	DF	SEN	Souleymane Diawara
24	DF	ENG	Jonathan Fortune
28	DF	ENG	Osei Sankofa
29	MF	ENG	Lloyd Sam (Note: Sam was born in Leeds, England, and represented them at U-20 level, but also qualified to represent Ghana internationally through his parents and would make his international debut for Ghana in October 2015.)
32	DF	WAL	Ben Thatcher (Note: Thatcher was born in Swindon, England and represented them at U-21 level, but also qualified to represent Wales internationally through his grandmother and made his international debut for Wales in March 2004.)
33	GK	IRL	Darren Randolph
35	DF	ENG	Nathan Ashton
36	GK	NOR	Thomas Myhre
38	GK	ENG	Scott Carson (on loan from Liverpool)

=== Left club during season ===
Note: Flags indicate national team as defined under FIFA eligibility rules; some limited exceptions apply. Players may hold more than one non-FIFA nationality.

No.	Pos.	Nation	Player
9	FW	JAM	Jason Euell (Note: Euell was born in Lambeth, England, and represented them at U-21 level, but also qualified to represent Jamaica internationally through his father and made his international debut for Jamaica in November 2004.) (to Middlesbrough)
13	MF	URU	Omar Pouso (on loan from Peñarol)
16	GK	DEN	Stephan Andersen (to Brøndby)

No.	Pos.	Nation	Player
22	DF	MLI	Djimi Traoré (Note: Traoré was born in Saint-Ouen-sur-Seine, France, but also qualified to represent Mali internationally and made his international debut for Mali in 2004.) (to Portsmouth)
25	DF	URU	Gonzalo Sorondo (released)
32	FW	NIR	Michael Carvill (released)

=== Reserve squad ===
The following players did not appear for the first team this season.

Note: Flags indicate national team as defined under FIFA eligibility rules; some limited exceptions apply. Players may hold more than one non-FIFA nationality.

No.	Pos.	Nation	Player
17	DF	USA	Cory Gibbs
21	MF	ENG	Simon Walton
25	FW	ENG	Chris Dickson (Note: Dickson was born in Southwark, England, but also qualified to represent Ghana and Jamaica internationally through his father and mother respectively and would make his international debut for Ghana in August 2008.)
26	DF	CTA	Kelly Youga
27	GK	IRL	Rob Elliot (Note: Elliot was born in Greenwich, England, but also qualifies to represent the Republic of Ireland internationally through his father and represented them at under-19 level before making his international debut for the Republic of Ireland in May 2014.)
30	FW	ENG	Myles Weston (Note: Weston was born in Lewisham, England, and represented them at every youth level between U-16 and U-19, but also qualified to represent Antigua and Barbuda internationally and would make his international debut for Antigua and Barbuda in November 2014.)
31	MF	ENG	Alistair John

No.	Pos.	Nation	Player
34	DF	FIN	Jani Tanska
37	FW	ENG	James Walker (Note: Walker was born in Hackney, England, and represented them at U-18 level, but also qualified to represent Antigua and Barbuda internationally and would make his international debut for Antigua and Barbuda in September 2012.)
39	MF	ISL	Rúrik Gíslason
40	MF	ENG	Rashid Yussuff
41	FW	ENG	Donovan Simmonds
42	DF	ENG	Aswad Thomas

=== Trialists ===
Note: Flags indicate national team as defined under FIFA eligibility rules; some limited exceptions apply. Players may hold more than one non-FIFA nationality.

No.	Pos.	Nation	Player
—	GK	USA	Chris Konopka

== Statistics ==
=== Appearances and goals ===
No.	Pos	Nat	Player	Total		Premier League		FA Cup		League Cup	
No.	Pos	Nat	Player	Apps	Goals	Apps	Goals	Apps	Goals	Apps	Goals
Goalkeepers
33	GK	(Republic of Ireland) IRL	Darren Randolph	1	0	1	0	0	0	0	0
36	GK	(Norway) NOR	Thomas Myhre	4	0	1	0	1	0	2	0
38	GK	(England) ENG	Scott Carson	38	0	36	0	0	0	2	0
Defenders
2	DF	(England) ENG	Luke Young	32	1	29	1	0	0	3	0
3	DF	(Iceland) ISL	Hermann Hreiðarsson	33	0	30+1	0	0	0	2	0
15	DF	(Morocco) MAR	Talal El Karkouri	39	3	36	3	1	0	2	0
22	DF	(Algeria) ALG	Madjid Bougherra	5	0	2+3	0	0	0	0	0
23	DF	(Senegal) SEN	Souleymane Diawara	26	0	18+5	0	0+1	0	2	0
24	DF	(England) ENG	Jonathan Fortune	13	0	6+2	0	1	0	4	0
28	DF	(England) ENG	Osei Sankofa	12	0	9	0	0	0	1+2	0
32	DF	(Wales) WAL	Ben Thatcher	11	0	10+1	0	0	0	0	0
35	DF	(England) ENG	Nathan Ashton	1	0	0	0	0	0	1	0
Midfielders
4	MF	(Senegal) SEN	Amdy Faye	32	1	25+3	1	1	0	2+1	0
6	MF	(Bulgaria) BUL	Radostin Kishishev	18	0	6+8	0	1	0	3	0
8	MF	(Republic of Ireland) IRL	Matt Holland	36	1	27+6	1	1	0	1+1	0
9	MF	(China) CHN	Zheng Zhi	12	1	8+4	1	0	0	0	0
11	MF	(England) ENG	Darren Ambrose	30	3	21+5	3	1	0	1+2	0
14	MF	(England) ENG	Jerome Thomas	24	3	16+4	3	0+1	0	3	0
16	MF	(Cameroon) CMR	Alex Song	12	0	12	0	0	0	0	0
19	MF	(Denmark) DEN	Dennis Rommedahl	32	0	19+9	0	1	0	2+1	0
20	MF	(England) ENG	Bryan Hughes	27	1	15+9	1	0	0	3	0
29	MF	(England) ENG	Lloyd Sam	9	0	3+4	0	0+1	0	0+1	0
5	MF	(Republic of Ireland) IRL	Andy Reid	16	2	16	2	0	0	0	0
Forwards
7	FW	(England) ENG	Marcus Bent	35	2	17+13	1	1	0	4	1
10	FW	(England) ENG	Darren Bent	35	15	32	13	0	0	2+1	2
12	FW	(Jamaica) JAM	Kevin Lisbie	9	0	1+7	0	0	0	0+1	0
18	FW	(Netherlands) NED	Jimmy Floyd Hasselbaink	29	4	11+14	2	1	0	2+1	2
Players transferred out during the season
13	MF	(Uruguay) URU	Omar Pouso	1	0	1	0	0	0	0	0
22	DF	(Mali) MLI	Djimi Traoré	13	0	11	0	1	0	1	0
25	DF	(Uruguay) URU	Gonzalo Sorondo	1	0	0+1	0	0	0	0	0

Last updated: 30 May 2007
Source: Competitions

== Transfers ==
=== In ===
- (United States) Cory Gibbs - (Netherlands) Feyenoord, 8 May, free
- (Netherlands) Jimmy Floyd Hasselbaink - (England) Middlesbrough, 11 July, free
- (Mali) Djimi Traoré - (England) Liverpool, 8 August, £2,000,000
- (Senegal) Amdy Faye - (England) Newcastle United, 8 August, £2,000,000
- (England) Scott Carson - (England) Liverpool, 14 August, season-long loan
- (Republic of Ireland) Andy Reid - (England) Tottenham Hotspur, 16 August, £3,000,000
- (Senegal) Souleymane Diawara - (France) Sochaux, 31 August, £3,700,000
- (China) Zheng Zhi - (China) Shandong Luneng Taishan, 29 December, season-long loan
- (Wales) Ben Thatcher - (England) Manchester City, 11 January, £500,000 (rising to £750,000)
- (Algeria) Madjid Bougherra - (England) Sheffield Wednesday, 28 January, £2,500,000
- (Cameroon) Alex Song - (England) Arsenal, 30 January, season-long loan

=== Out ===
- (England) Chris Powell - (England) Watford, 1 July, free
- (England) Francis Jeffers - (England) Blackburn Rovers, 3 July, free
- (England) Chris Perry - (England) West Bromwich Albion, 4 July, free
- (England) Jay Bothroyd - (England) Wolverhampton Wanderers, 26 July, free
- (Jamaica) Jason Euell - (England) Middlesbrough, 31 August, £300,000
- (Mali) Djimi Traoré - (England) Portsmouth, 13 January, £1,000,000
- (South Africa) Shaun Bartlett - (South Africa) Kaizer Chiefs, free

Transfers in: ▼£13,700,000
Transfers out: ▲£1,300,000
Total spending: ▼£12,400,000

== Results ==
=== Results per matchday ===
Matchday	1	2	3	4	5	6	7	8	9	10	11	12	13	14	15	16	17	18	19	20	21	22	23	24	25	26	27	28	29	30	31	32	33	34	35	36	37	38
Ground	A	H	H	A	H	A	H	A	H	A	H	A	A	H	H	A	A	H	A	H	H	A	H	A	A	H	A	H	A	H	H	A	H	A	H	A	H	A
Result	L	L	W	L	L	L	L	L	D	D	W	L	L	D	W	L	L	L	L	D	W	L	L	W	D	L	L	W	D	W	W	D	D	L	D	L	L	D
Position	16	20	15	16	18	19	20	20	20	20	20	20	20	20	19	19	19	19	19	19	19	19	19	19	19	19	19	18	18	18	18	17	17	18	18	19	19	19

Source: WorldFootball.com
A = Away; H = Home; W = Win; D = Draw; L = Loss

=== Premier League ===
Win	Draw	Loss

Round	Date	Opponent	Venue	Result F–A	Scorers	Attendance	Ref.
1	19 August 2006	West Ham United	Away	1–3	D. Bent 15' (pen.)	34,937	
2	23 August 2006	Manchester United	Home	0–3	—	25,422	
3	26 August 2006	Bolton Wanderers	Home	2–0	D. Bent 65' (pen.), 85'	23,638	
4	9 September 2006	Chelsea	Away	1–2	Hasselbaink 54'	41,194	
5	16 September 2006	Portsmouth	Home	0–1	—	26,130	
6	23 September 2006	Aston Villa	Away	0–2	—	35,513	
7	30 September 2006	Arsenal	Home	1–2	D. Bent 22'	26,770	
8	16 October 2006	Fulham	Away	1–2	D. Bent 78'	19,179	
9	21 October 2006	Watford	Home	0–0	—	27,011	
10	28 October 2006	Newcastle	Away	0–0	—	48,642	
11	4 November 2006	Manchester City	Home	1–0	D. Bent 28'	26,011	
12	11 November 2006	Wigan Athletic	Away	2–3	de Zeeuw 52' (o.g.), M. Bent 90'	16,572	
13	18 November 2006	Reading	Away	0–2	—	24,093	
14	25 November 2006	Everton	Home	1–1	Reid 68'	26,435	
15	2 December 2006	Sheffield United	Away	1–2	Reid 17'	27,368	
16	5 December 2006	Blackburn Rovers	Home	1–0	El Karkouri 90'	23,423	
17	9 December 2006	Tottenham Hotspur	Away	1–5	Dawson 43' (o.g.)	35,565	
18	16 December 2006	Liverpool	Home	0–3	—	27,111	
19	23 December 2006	Middlesbrough	Away	0–2	—	32,013	
20	27 December 2006	Fulham	Home	2–2	Ambrose 19', D. Bent 45'	25,203	
21	30 December 2006	Aston Villa	Home	2–1	D. Bent 57', Hughes 90'	26,699	
22	2 January 2007	Arsenal	Away	0–4	—	60,057	
23	13 January 2007	Middlesbrough	Home	1–3	Hasselbaink 27'	26,384	
24	20 January 2007	Portsmouth	Away	1–0	Faye 79'	19,567	
25	31 January 2007	Bolton Wanderers	Away	1–1	El Karkouri 12'	22,357	
26	3 February 2007	Chelsea	Home	0–1	—	27,111	
27	10 February 2007	Manchester United	Away	0–2	—	75,883	
28	24 February 2007	West Ham United	Home	4–0	Ambrose 24', Thomas 34', 80', D. Bent 41'	27,111	
29	3 March 2007	Watford	Away	2–2	Young 67', Ambrose 89'	19,782	
30	18 March 2007	Newcastle United	Home	2–0	Zheng 53', Thomas 88' (pen.)	27,028	
31	31 March 2007	Wigan Athletic	Home	1–0	D. Bent 86' (pen.)	26,500	
32	6 April 2007	Manchester City	Away	0–0	—	41,424	
33	9 April 2007	Reading	Home	0–0	—	26,271	
34	15 April 2007	Everton	Away	1–2	D. Bent 89'	34,028	
35	21 April 2007	Sheffield United	Home	1–1	El Karkouri 59'	27,111	
36	28 April 2007	Blackburn Rovers	Away	1–4	D. Bent 71'	24,921	
37	7 May 2007	Tottenham Hotspur	Home	0–2	—	26,339	
38	13 May 2007	Liverpool	Away	2–2	Holland 2', D. Bent 72'	43,134	

=== FA Cup ===
Win	Draw	Loss

Round	Date	Opponent	Venue	Result F–A	Scorers	Attendance	Ref.
Third round	6 January 2007	Nottingham Forest	Away	0–2	—	19,017	

=== League Cup ===
Win	Draw	Loss

Round	Date	Opponent	Venue	Result F–A	Scorers	Attendance	Ref.
Second round	19 September 2006	Carlisle United	Home	1–0	D. Bent 57'	8,190	
Third round	25 October 2006	Bolton Wanderers	Home	1–0	M. Bent 17'	10,788	
Fourth round	7 November 2006	Chesterfield	Away	3–3 (a.e.t.) (4–3 p)	Hasselbaink 40', 93', D. Bent 73'	7,000	
Quarter-finals	19 December 2006	Wycombe Wanderers	Home	0–1	—	18,940	
