= 2009–10 Aston Villa F.C. season =

English football club season

Aston Villa
2009–10 season
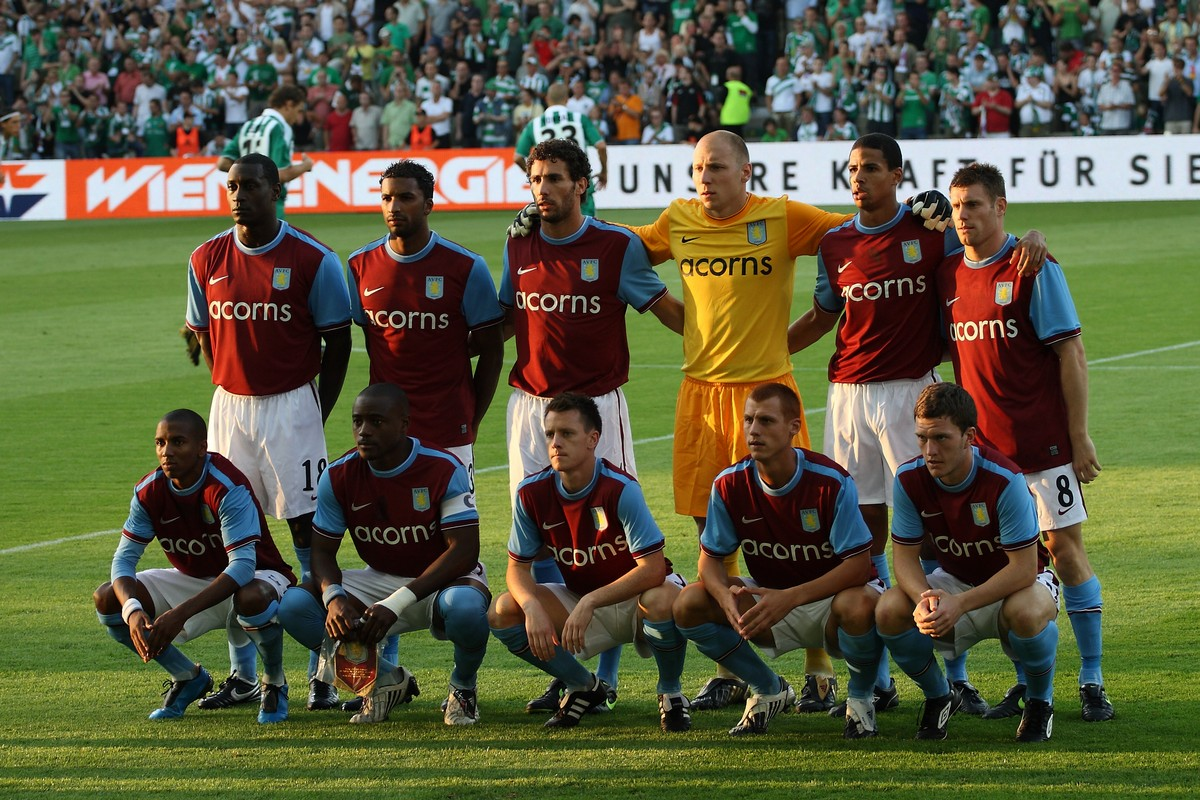
- Villa on 20 August 2009 in Vienna
- Chairman: Randy Lerner
- Manager: Martin O'Neill
- Premier League: 6th
- FA Cup: Semi-finals
- League Cup: Runners-up
- UEFA Europa League: Play-off round
- Top goalscorer: League: Gabriel Agbonlahor (13); All: John Carew (17)
- Highest home attendance: 42,788 vs Liverpool (29 December 2009), Manchester United (10 February 2010), Birmingham City (25 April 2010)
- Lowest home attendance: 22,527 vs Cardiff City (23 September 2009)
Home colours	Away colours	Third colours

Second City Derby
- 54--36--28

The 2009-10 season was Aston Villa's 18th season in the Premier League. Villa again competed in the Premier League, and finished sixth for the third season in a row. The 2009–10 Premier League season was Villa's 135th season in English football. It was the club's 99th season in the top-flight and their 22nd consecutive season in the top flight of English football, the Premier League. They were managed by Martin O'Neill – in his fourth season since replacing David O'Leary.The 2009–10 season was Villa's second consecutive spell in European competition for the club, and the first in the newly formatted UEFA Europa League.

This term marked the first for the club without long-term player and former captain Gareth Barry following his £12 million move to Manchester City on 2 June 2009. Barry had been at the club since 1997.

The Birmingham Derby made a return to the Premier League after local rivals Birmingham City were promoted to the top tier. Villa won the first of two fixtures 1–0 at St Andrew's on 13 September 2009 with Gabriel Agbonlahor scoring the winning goal. Villa also won the return fixture at Villa Park 1–0 on 25 April 2010, thanks to a James Milner penalty. Villa also played games against newly promoted Wolves from nearby Wolverhampton, resulting in a 1–1 draw at Molineux and a 2–2 draw at Villa Park.

The club progressed to the final of the League Cup during this season, eliminating Cardiff City, Sunderland, Portsmouth and Blackburn Rovers along the way. However, Aston Villa were beaten 2–1 by Manchester United in the final at Wembley Stadium on 28 February 2010. Villa's other domestic cup venture also took the club to Wembley in the FA Cup, where they were defeated 3–0 by Chelsea in the semi-final. Aston Villa finished 6th in the Premier League for the 3rd year in a row, with 2 points more than previous season, they also qualified for the Europa League for the 3rd year running.

Kit Supplier	Sponsor
Nike	Acorns*

*Villa passed up sponsorship for the 2008-09 season and instead displayed the children's hospice charity, Acorns.

== First team squad ==
Note: Flags indicate national team as defined under FIFA eligibility rules; some limited exceptions apply. Players may hold more than one non-FIFA nationality.

No.	Pos.	Nation	Player
1	GK	USA	Brad Friedel
2	DF	ENG	Luke Young
3	DF	NED	Wilfred Bouma
4	MF	ENG	Steve Sidwell
5	DF	IRL	Richard Dunne
6	MF	ENG	Stewart Downing
7	MF	ENG	Ashley Young
8	MF	ENG	James Milner
10	FW	NOR	John Carew
11	FW	ENG	Gabriel Agbonlahor
12	MF	ENG	Marc Albrighton
14	FW	ENG	Nathan Delfouneso
15	DF	ENG	Curtis Davies
16	MF	ENG	Fabian Delph

No.	Pos.	Nation	Player
18	FW	ENG	Emile Heskey
19	MF	BUL	Stiliyan Petrov (captain)
20	MF	ENG	Nigel Reo-Coker
21	DF	ENG	Nicky Shorey
22	GK	USA	Brad Guzan
23	DF	SEN	Habib Beye
24	DF	ESP	Carlos Cuéllar
25	DF	ENG	Stephen Warnock
26	MF	ENG	Craig Gardner
29	DF	WAL	James Collins
33	GK	ENG	Andy Marshall
45	MF	AUS	Shane Lowry
47	DF	ENG	Ciaran Clark

=== Left club during season ===
Note: Flags indicate national team as defined under FIFA eligibility rules; some limited exceptions apply. Players may hold more than one non-FIFA nationality.

No.	Pos.	Nation	Player
9	FW	ENG	Marlon Harewood (on loan to Newcastle United)
21	DF	ENG	Nicky Shorey (on loan to Nottingham Forest and Fulham)
26	MF	ENG	Craig Gardner (to Birmingham City)
27	MF	ENG	Isaiah Osbourne (on loan to Middlesbrough)
44	DF	USA	Eric Lichaj (on loan to Lincoln City and Leyton Orient)

No.	Pos.	Nation	Player
45	MF	AUS	Shane Lowry (on loan to Plymouth and Leeds United)
46	MF	SCO	Barry Bannan (on loan to Blackpool)
48	DF	ENG	Nathan Baker (on loan to Lincoln City)
49	MF	AUS	Chris Herd (on loan to Lincoln City)
50	MF	ENG	Jonathan Hogg (on loan to Darlington)

== Reserve squad ==
Note: Flags indicate national team as defined under FIFA eligibility rules; some limited exceptions apply. Players may hold more than one non-FIFA nationality.

No.	Pos.	Nation	Player
9	FW	ENG	Marlon Harewood
17	MF	TOG	Moustapha Salifou
27	MF	ENG	Isaiah Osbourne
42	FW	AUT	Andreas Weimann
43	GK	ENG	Elliott Parish

No.	Pos.	Nation	Player
44	DF	USA	Eric Lichaj
46	MF	SCO	Barry Bannan
48	DF	ENG	Nathan Baker
49	MF	AUS	Chris Herd
50	MF	ENG	Jonathan Hogg

== Kit changes ==
The club once again dismissed sponsorship payments to allow Acorns as a charitable sponsor. A new away kit was unveiled on 24 May 2009 and inspired by the England national football team. It features a white and gray halved style with pinstripes and a navy accent, intended to pay tribute to the 67 Villa players that have appeared for the country while at the club. The blue and black away kit of 2008–09 also became this season's third kit. The new home kit was unveiled the day before the first clash of the Peace Cup 2009, which was against Málaga on Saturday 25 July.

== Premier League ==
=== Final league position ===
Pos	Team	Pld	W	D	L	GF	GA	GD	Pts	Qualification or relegation
4	Tottenham Hotspur	38	21	7	10	67	41	+26	70	Qualification for the Champions League play-off round
5	Manchester City	38	18	13	7	73	45	+28	67	Qualification for the Europa League play-off round (Note: Since Manchester United won the League Cup and then qualified for the Champions League, their spot in the Europa League was passed down to the 6th-placed team. The 6th-placed Aston Villa was coincidentally also the League Cup runners-up.)
6	Aston Villa	38	17	13	8	52	39	+13	64	Qualification for the Europa League play-off round
7	Liverpool	38	18	9	11	61	35	+26	63	Qualification for the Europa League third qualifying round (Note: Originally Portsmouth qualified for the third qualifying round of the Europa League as the FA Cup runners-up, replacing the winners, Champions League-qualified Chelsea. However, they failed to apply for a UEFA licence. Therefore, Liverpool as the best placed team not qualified for the European competitions took their place.)
8	Everton	38	16	13	9	60	49	+11	61	

Source: Barclays Premier League

=== Results ===
==== Results by matchday ====
Matchday	1	2	3	4	5	6	7	8	9	10	11	12	13	14	15	16	17	18	19	20	21	22	23	24	25	26	27	28	29	30	31	32	33	34	35	36	37	38
Ground	H	A	A	H	A	H	A	H	H	A	A	H	A	H	H	A	A	H	A	H	A	H	H	A	A	H	H	A	H	A	H	A	A	H	A	H	A	H
Result	L	W	W	W	W	L	D	W	D	D	L	W	D	D	W	W	W	W	L	L	D	D	W	D	D	W	D	W	D	D	L	W	D	W	W	W	L	L
Position	16	12	8	6	5	7	7	6	7	7	7	5	5	6	5	4	4	4	4	6	7	7	7	7	7	7	7	7	7	7	7	7	7	7	6	5	6	6

Source: worldfootball.net
A = Away; H = Home; W = Win; D = Draw; L = Loss

15 August 2009 1	Aston Villa	0–2	Wigan Athletic	Birmingham
			Rodallega 31'; Koumas 56'	Stadium: Villa Park; Attendance: 35,578

24 August 2009 2	Liverpool	1–3	Aston Villa	Liverpool
	Torres 72'		Lucas 34' (o.g.); Davies 44'; A. Young 75'	Stadium: Anfield; Attendance: 43,667

30 August 2009 3	Aston Villa	2–0	Fulham	Birmingham
	Pantsil 3' (o.g.); Agbonlahor 60'			Stadium: Villa Park; Attendance: 32,917

13 September 2009 4	Birmingham City	0–1	Aston Villa	Birmingham
			Agbonlahor 85'	Stadium: St Andrew's; Attendance: 25,196

19 September 2009 5	Aston Villa	2–0	Portsmouth	Birmingham
	Milner 34' (pen.); Agbonlahor 43'			Stadium: Villa Park; Attendance: 35,979

26 September 2009 6	Blackburn Rovers	2–1	Aston Villa	Blackburn
	Samba 24'; Dunn 88' (pen.)		Agbonlahor 3'	Stadium: Ewood Park; Attendance: 25,172

5 October 2009 7	Aston Villa	1–1	Manchester City	Birmingham
	Dunne 15'		Bellamy 67'	Stadium: Villa Park; Attendance: 37,924

17 October 2009 8	Aston Villa	2–1	Chelsea	Birmingham
	Dunne 32'; Collins 52'		Drogba 15'	Stadium: Villa Park; Attendance: 39,047

24 October 2009 9	Wolverhampton Wanderers	1–1	Aston Villa	Wolverhampton
	Ebanks-Blake 83' (pen.)		Agbonlahor 79'	Stadium: Molineux

31 October 2009 10	Everton	1–1	Aston Villa	Liverpool
	Bilyaletdinov 44'		Carew 46'	Stadium: Goodison Park; Attendance: 36,648

4 November 2009 11	West Ham United	2–1	Aston Villa	London
	Noble 44' (pen.); Hines 90'		A. Young 52'	Stadium: Boleyn Ground; Attendance: 30,024

7 November 2009 12	Aston Villa	5–1	Bolton Wanderers	Birmingham
	A. Young 5'; Agbonlahor 43'; Carew 53'; Milner 72'; Cuéllar 76'		Elmander 44'	Stadium: Villa Park; Attendance: 38,101

21 November 2009 13	Burnley	1–1	Aston Villa	Burnley
	Caldwell 9'		Heskey 86'	Stadium: Turf Moor; Attendance: 21,179

28 November 2009 14	Aston Villa	1–1	Tottenham Hotspur	Birmingham
	Agbonlahor 10'		Dawson 77'	Stadium: Villa Park; Attendance: 39,866

5 December 2009 15	Aston Villa	3–0	Hull City	Birmingham
	Dunne 13'; Milner 29'; Carew 88' (pen.)			Stadium: Villa Park; Attendance: 39,748

12 December 2009 16	Manchester United	0–1	Aston Villa	Manchester
			Agbonlahor 21'	Stadium: Old Trafford; Attendance: 75,130

15 December 2009 17	Sunderland	0–2	Aston Villa	Sunderland
			Heskey 24'; Milner 61'	Stadium: Stadium of Light; Attendance: 34,821

19 December 2009 18	Aston Villa	1–0	Stoke City	Birmingham
	Carew 61'			Stadium: Villa Park; Attendance: 35,852

27 December 2009 19	Arsenal	3–0	Aston Villa	London
	Fàbregas 65', 81'; Diaby 90'			Stadium: Emirates Stadium; Attendance: 60,056

29 December 2009 20	Aston Villa	0–1	Liverpool	Birmingham
			Torres 90+3'	Stadium: Villa Park; Attendance: 42,788

17 January 2010 21	Aston Villa	0–0	West Ham United	Birmingham
				Stadium: Villa Park; Attendance: 35,646

27 January 2010 22	Aston Villa	0–0	Arsenal	Birmingham
				Stadium: Villa Park; Attendance: 39,601

30 January 2010 23	Fulham	0–2	Aston Villa	London
			Agbonlahor 40', 44'	Stadium: Craven Cottage; Attendance: 25,408

6 February 2010 24	Tottenham Hotspur	0–0	Aston Villa	London
				Stadium: White Hart Lane; Attendance: 35,899

10 February 2010 25	Aston Villa	1–1	Manchester United	Birmingham
	Cuéllar 19'		Collins 23' (o.g.)	Stadium: Villa Park; Attendance: 42,788

21 February 2010 26	Aston Villa	5–2	Burnley	Birmingham
	A. Young 32'; Downing 56', 58'; Heskey 61'; Agbonlahor 68'		S. Fletcher 10'; Paterson 90'	Stadium: Villa Park; Attendance: 38,709

13 March 2010 27	Stoke City	0–0	Aston Villa	Stoke-on-Trent
				Stadium: Britannia Stadium; Attendance: 27,598

16 March 2010 28	Wigan Athletic	1–2	Aston Villa	Wigan
	Caldwell 27'		McCarthy 25' (o.g.); Milner 63'	Stadium: DW Stadium; Attendance: 16,186

20 March 2010 29	Aston Villa	2–2	Wolverhampton Wanderers	Birmingham
	Carew 16', 82'		Craddock 23'; Milner 38' (o.g.)	Stadium: Villa Park; Attendance: 37,562

24 March 2010 30	Aston Villa	1–1	Sunderland	Birmingham
	Carew 30'		F. Campbell 22'	Stadium: Villa Park; Attendance: 37,473

27 March 2010 31	Chelsea	7–1	Aston Villa	London
	Lampard 15', 44' (pen.), 62' (pen.), 90+1'; Malouda 57', 68'; Kalou 83'		Carew 29'	Stadium: Stamford Bridge; Attendance: 41,825

3 April 2010 32	Bolton Wanderers	0–1	Aston Villa	Bolton
			A. Young 11'	Stadium: Reebok Stadium; Attendance: 22,000

15 April 2010 33	Aston Villa	2–2	Everton	Birmingham
	Agbonlahor 72'; Jagielka 90' (o.g.)		T. Cahill 23', 74'	Stadium: Villa Park; Attendance: 38,729

18 April 2010 34	Portsmouth	1–2	Aston Villa	Portsmouth
	M. Brown 10'		Carew 16'; Delfouneso 82'	Stadium: Fratton Park; Attendance: 16,523

21 April 2010 35	Hull City	0–2	Aston Villa	Kingston-upon-Hull
			Agbonlahor 14'; Milner 76' (pen.)	Stadium: KC Stadium; Attendance: 23,842

25 April 2010 36	Aston Villa	1–0	Birmingham City	Birmingham
	Milner 83' (pen.)			Stadium: Villa Park; Attendance: 42,788

1 May 2010 37	Manchester City	3–1	Aston Villa	Manchester
	Tevez 42' (pen.); Adebayor 43'; Bellamy 90'		Carew 16'	Stadium: City of Manchester Stadium; Attendance: 47,102

9 May 2010 38	Aston Villa	0–1	Blackburn Rovers	Birmingham
			Dunne 84' (o.g.)	Stadium: Villa Park; Attendance: 41,799

== Cup matches ==
=== FA Cup ===
Date	Round	Opponent	Venue	Result	Attendance	Scorers
02/01/2010	R3	Blackburn Rovers	H	3–1	25,453	Delfouneso, Cuéllar, Carew (pen.)
23 January 2010	R4	Brighton and Hove Albion	H	3–2	39,725	Delfouneso, A. Young, Delph
14 February 2010	R5	Crystal Palace	A	2–2	20,486	Collins, Petrov
24 February 2010	R5 (R)	Crystal Palace	H	3–1	31,874	Agbonlahor, Carew (2 pen.)
07/03/2010	R6	Reading	A	4–2	23,175	A. Young, Carew (3, 1 pen.)
10/04/2010	SF	Chelsea	N	0–3	85,472	

=== League Cup ===
Date	Round	Opponent	Venue	Result	Attendance	Scorers
23 September 2009	R3	Cardiff City	H	1–0	22,527	Agbonlahor
27 October 2009	R4	Sunderland	A	0–0	27,666	(Pens: Carew, Collins, A. Young)
0–0 after extra time – Aston Villa won 3–1 on penalties
01/12/2009	QF	Portsmouth	A	4–2	17,034	Milner, Heskey, Downing, A. Young
14 January 2010	SF (1)	Blackburn Rovers	A	1–0	18,595	Milner
20 January 2010	SF (2)	Blackburn Rovers	H	6–4	40,406	Warnock, Milner (pen.), Nzonzi (o.g.), Agbonlahor, Heskey, A. Young
Aston Villa won 7–4 on aggregate
28 February 2010	F	Manchester United	N	1–2	88,596	Milner (pen.)

=== UEFA Europa League ===
Date	Round	Opponent	Venue	Result	Attendance	Scorers
20 August 2009	Play-off Round (1)	(Austria) Rapid Vienna	A	0–1	17,600	
27 August 2009	Play-off Round (2)	(Austria) Rapid Vienna	H	2–1	22,563	Milner (pen.), Carew
2–2 on aggregate; Rapid Vienna won on away goals

== Friendly matches ==
Date	Opponent	Venue	Result	Attendance	Scorers	
18 July 2009	Peterborough United	A	3–0		Weimann, Davies, Sidwell	
21 July 2009	Colchester United	A	2–2		Sidwell, McGurk	
04/08/2009	Oxford United	A	0–2	12,000		
08/08/2009	(Italy) Fiorentina	H	1–0	22,915		Heskey

=== Peace Cup ===
Date	Round	Opponent	Venue	Result	Attendance	Scorers	
25 July 2009	Group C	(Spain) Málaga	A	0–1	4,000		
29 July 2009	Group C	(Mexico) Atlante	N	3–1	1,000		Albrighton, Carew, A. Young
31 July 2009	Semi-Final	(Portugal) Porto	N	2–1	26,000		Heskey, Sidwell
02/08/2009	Final	(Italy) Juventus	N	0–0		(Pens: Bannan, Lowry, A. Young, Cuéllar)	
0–0 after extra time – Aston Villa won 4–3 on penalties

== Goalscorers ==
Name	Premier League	FA Cup	League Cup	Europa League	Total
(Norway) John Carew	10	6		1	17
(England) Gabriel Agbonlahor	13	1	2		16
(England) James Milner	7		4	1	12
(England) Ashley Young	5	2	2		9
(England) Emile Heskey	3		2		5
(Republic of Ireland) Richard Dunne	3				3
(Spain) Carlos Cuéllar	2	1			3
(England) Stewart Downing	2		1		3
(England) Nathan Delfouneso	1	2			3
(Wales) James Collins	1	1			2
(England) Curtis Davies	1				1
(England) Fabian Delph		1			1
(Bulgaria) Stiliyan Petrov		1			1
(England) Stephen Warnock			1		1
Opposition own goals	4		1		5
Total Goals	52	15	13	2	82

== Appearances ==
Name	League	FA Cup	League Cup	Europe	Start	Sub.	Total
(England) Ashley Young	37	6	5	2	50	0	50
(England) James Milner	36	5	6	2	48	1	49
(Spain) Carlos Cuéllar	38	4	6	2	48	0	48
(Bulgaria) Stilyan Petrov	38	3	6	1	47	0	48
(England) Gabriel Agbonlahor	36	2	6	2	43	3	46
(Republic of Ireland) Richard Dunne	35	4	5	0	44	0	44
(United States) Brad Friedel	38	3	1	0	42	0	42
(Norway) John Carew	33	5	3	1	27	15	42
(England) Emile Heskey	31	4	5	2	26	16	42
(England) Stephen Warnock	31	6	5	0	42	0	42
(Wales) James Collins	30	5	5	0	39	1	40
(England) Stewart Downing	23	6	4	0	33	2	35
(England) Steve Sidwell	25	4	3	1	14	19	33
(England) Luke Young	16	3	1	0	18	2	20
(England) Fabian Delph	8	4	2	1	10	5	15
(England) Nigel Reo-Coker	10	1	1	1	9	4	13
(England) Nathan Delfouneso	9	3	1	0	2	11	13
(Senegal) Habib Beye	6	2	1	2	10	1	11
(United States) Brad Guzan	0	3	5	2	10	0	10
(England) Marc Albrighton	3	1	1	1	1	5	6
(England) Nicky Shorey	3	0	1	2	6	0	6
(England) Curtis Davies	2	1	0	2	4	1	5
(England) Craig Gardner	1	0	1	1	2	1	3
(Australia) Shane Lowry	0	1	0	2	0	3	3
(England) Ciaran Clark	1	0	0	0	1	0	1

== Transfers ==
=== Transferred in ===
Date	Pos	Player	From	Fee
20 June 2009	AM	Samir Carruthers	Arsenal	Free transfer
16 July 2009	LM	Stewart Downing	Middlesbrough	£12,000,000
4 August 2009	CM	Fabian Delph	Leeds United	£6,000,000
7 August 2009	RB	(Senegal) Habib Beye	Newcastle United	£2,500,000
13 August 2009	GK	Andy Marshall	Coventry City	Free transfer
27 August 2009	LB	Stephen Warnock	Blackburn Rovers	£7,000,000
1 September 2009	CB	(Wales) James Collins	West Ham United	£5,000,000
1 September 2009	CB	(Republic of Ireland) Richard Dunne	Manchester City	£6,000,000
				£38,500,000

Record (equal)

=== Loaned in ===
Date	Pos	Player	From	Loan End

=== Transferred out ===
Date	Pos	Player	To	Fee
1 July 2009	CM	Gareth Barry	Manchester City	£12,000,000
1 July 2009	GK	Stuart Taylor	Manchester City	Free transfer
1 July 2009	CB	(Denmark) Martin Laursen	Retired	—N/a
21 July 2009	CF	Sam Williams	Yeovil Town	Free transfer
25 July 2009	CB	Zat Knight	Bolton Wanderers	£4,000,000
26 January 2010	CM	Craig Gardner	Birmingham City	£3,000,000
				£19,600,000

=== Loaned out ===
Date	Pos	Player	To	Loan End
5 August 2009	GK	(Republic of Ireland) David Bevan	Ilkeston Town	5 September 2009
18 September 2009	CB	(Australia) Shane Lowry	Plymouth Argyle	1 January 2010
26 September 2009	CF	Marlon Harewood	Newcastle United	31 December 2009
26 October 2009	CB	Nathan Baker	Lincoln City	1 January 2010
26 October 2009	CF	(Republic of Ireland) James Collins	Darlington	22 January 2010
26 October 2009	RB	(United States) Eric Lichaj	Lincoln City	1 January 2010
7 November 2009	CM	Isaiah Osbourne	Middlesbrough	5 January 2010
19 November 2009	CM	Jonathan Hogg	Darlington	2 January 2010
24 November 2009	LB	Nicky Shorey	Nottingham Forest	26 January 2010
26 November 2009	CM	(Scotland) Barry Bannan	Blackpool	31 May 2010
26 November 2009	CM	(Australia) Chris Herd	Lincoln City	26 December 2009
5 December 2009	GK	(Republic of Ireland) David Bevan	Solihull Moors	5 January 2010
30 January 2010	CB	(Australia) Shane Lowry	Leeds United	31 May 2010
1 February 2010	LB	Nicky Shorey	Fulham	31 May 2010
26 March 2010	RB	(United States) Eric Lichaj	Leyton Orient	31 May 2010

=== Overall transfer activity ===
==== Expenditure ====
▼£38,500,000

==== Income ====
▲£19,600,000

==== Balance ====
▼£18,900,000

== See also ==
- 2009–10 in English football
- List of Aston Villa F.C. seasons
