= 2007–08 Aston Villa F.C. season =

English football club season

Aston Villa
2007–08 season
- Chairman: Randy Lerner
- Manager: Martin O'Neill
- Premier League: 6th
- FA Cup: Third round
- League Cup: Third round
- Top goalscorer: League: John Carew (13); All: John Carew (13)
- Highest home attendance: 42,640 (vs. Manchester United, Liverpool, Newcastle United and Sunderland)
- Lowest home attendance: 25,956 (vs. Leicester City)
Home colours	Away colours	Third colours

Second City Derby
- 52--36--28

The 2007-08 season was Aston Villa's 16th season in the Premier League. The 2007–08 Premier League season was Villa's 133rd season in English football. It was the club's 20th consecutive season in the top flight of English football and 16th consecutive season in the Premier League. The season saw Martin O'Neill continue as manager as the club impressed in league competition, but struggled in both domestic cup competitions – being knocked out in the third round of both.

There were debuts for Nigel Reo-Coker, Zat Knight, Scott Carson, Marlon Harewood, Curtis Davies, Moustapha Salifou and Wayne Routledge. Reo-Coker scored his first goal for Villa in a 5–0 League Cup 2nd round victory over Wrexham on 28 August 2007. Zat Knight signed from Fulham. His last Fulham match was the 2–1 defeat against Villa, in which he played a part in Villa's equaliser when an Ashley Young shot deflected off him into the net, although this was later given as Young's goal. Carson was loaned from Liverpool where he had been 2nd choice to Pepe Reina with further competition from Charles Itandje.

Kit Supplier	Sponsor
Nike	32Red.com

== Premier League ==
Pos	Team	Pld	W	D	L	GF	GA	GD	Pts	Qualification or relegation
4	Liverpool	38	21	13	4	67	28	+39	76	Qualification for the Champions League third qualifying round
5	Everton	38	19	8	11	55	33	+22	65	Qualification for the UEFA Cup first round
6	Aston Villa	38	16	12	10	71	51	+20	60	Qualification for the Intertoto Cup third round
7	Blackburn Rovers	38	15	13	10	50	48	+2	58	
8	Portsmouth	38	16	9	13	48	40	+8	57	Qualification for the UEFA Cup first round (Note: As FA Cup winners)

Source: Barclays Premier League
Rules for classification: 1) points; 2) goal difference; 3) number of goals scored.
For further information on European qualification see Premier League – Competition

=== Matches ===
Matchday	1	2	3	4	5	6	7	8	9	10	11	12	13	14	15	16	17	18	19	20	21	22	23	24	25	26	27	28	29	30	31	32	33	34	35	36	37	38
Ground	H	A	A	H	H	A	H	A	H	H	A	H	A	A	H	H	A	H	A	A	H	H	A	H	A	H	A	A	H	A	H	A	H	A	H	A	H	A
Result	L	W	D	W	W	L	W	D	W	L	D	W	W	W	L	L	D	D	D	W	W	W	D	D	L	W	W	D	D	L	L	L	W	W	W	D	L	D
Position	14	8	9	5	3	6	4	5	5	9	8	8	6	6	7	8	8	8	8	7	7	6	6	6	6	6	6	6	6	7	7	8	7	7	6	6	6	6

Source: worldfootball.net
A = Away; H = Home; W = Win; D = Draw; L = Loss

11 August 2007 1	Aston Villa	1–2	Liverpool	Birmingham, West Midlands
	Mellberg (yellow card) 26'; Bouma (yellow card) 58'; Barry (yellow card) 67', (goal) 85' (pen.); Petrov (yellow card) 89'	Report	Laursen 31' (o.g.); Pennant (yellow card) 55'; Reina (yellow card) 84'; Gerrard 87'	Stadium: Villa Park; Attendance: 42,640

18 August 2007 2	Newcastle United	0–0	Aston Villa	Newcastle upon Tyne
15:00 BST		Report	Gardner (yellow card) 68'; Reo-Coker (yellow card) 87'	Stadium: St. James' Park; Attendance: 51,049; Referee: Howard Webb

25 August 2007 3	Aston Villa	2–1	Fulham	Birmingham, West Midlands
	Young 51'; Maloney 90'	Report	Baird 6'	Stadium: Villa Park; Attendance: 36,638

2 September 2007 4	Aston Villa	2–0	Chelsea	Birmingham, West Midlands
16:00 BST	Knight 47'; Reo-Coker (yellow card) 56'; Barry (yellow card) 66'; Carew (yellow card) 71'; Agbonlahor 88'	Report	Drogba (yellow card) 70'	Stadium: Villa Park; Attendance: 37,714; Referee: Mark Clattenburg

16 September 2007 5	Manchester City	1–0	Aston Villa	Manchester
16:00 BST	M. Johnson 47'; Sun (yellow card) 68'; Moore (yellow card) 78'	Report		Stadium: City of Manchester Stadium; Attendance: 38,363; Referee: Martin Atkinson

23 September 2007 6	Aston Villa	2–0	Everton	Birmingham, West Midlands
	Carew 14'; Agbonlahor 50'	Report		Stadium: Villa Park; Attendance: 38,747

1 October 2007 7	Tottenham Hotspur	4–4	Aston Villa	Haringey, London
	Berbatov 20'; Chimbonda 69'; Keane 82' (pen.); Kaboul 90'	Report	Laursen 22', 33'; Agbonlahor 40'; Gardner 49'	Stadium: White Hart Lane; Attendance: 36,094; Referee: Mike Dean

6 October 2007 8	Aston Villa	1–0	West Ham United	Birmingham, West Midlands
	Gardner 24'	Report		Stadium: Villa Park; Attendance: 40,842

20 October 2007 9	Aston Villa	1–4	Manchester United	Birmingham, West Midlands
	Agbonlahor 12'; Reo-Coker (red card) 60'; Carson (red card) 66'	Report	Rooney 36', 44'; Ferdinand 45'; Giggs 75'	Stadium: Villa Park; Attendance: 42,640; Referee: Rob Styles

28 October 2007 10	Bolton Wanderers	1–1	Aston Villa	Greater Manchester
	Anelka 22'	Report	Moore 57'	Stadium: Reebok Stadium; Attendance: 18,413

3 November 2007 11	Aston Villa	2–0	Derby County	Birmingham, West Midlands
	Laursen 57'; Young 61'	Report		Stadium: Villa Park; Attendance: 40,938

11 November 2007 12	Birmingham	1–2	Aston Villa	Birmingham
	Forssell 62'	Report	Ridgewell 11' (o.g.); Agbonlahor 87'	Stadium: St Andrew's; Attendance: 26,539

24 November 2007 13	Middlesbrough	0–3	Aston Villa	Teesside
		Report	Carew 45'; Mellberg 48'; Agbonlahor 58'	Stadium: Riverside Stadium; Attendance: 23,900

28 November 2007 14	Blackburn Rovers	0–4	Aston Villa	Blackburn, Lancashire
		Report	Carew 29'; Agbonlahor 53' (pen.); Young 81'; Harewood 89'	Stadium: Ewood Park; Attendance: 20,776; Referee: Phil Dowd

1 December 2007 15	Aston Villa	1–2	Arsenal	Birmingham, West Midlands
	Gardner 14'	Report	Flamini 23'; Adebayor 35'	Stadium: Villa Park; Attendance: 42,018

8 December 2007 16	Aston Villa	1–3	Portsmouth	Birmingham, West Midlands
12:45	Carew (yellow card) 4'; Berger (yellow card) 67'; Barry 72' (pen.)	Report	Gardner 10' (o.g.); Muntari 40', 61'; Mendes (yellow card) 43'; Johnson (yellow card) 68'; James (yellow card) 74'; Pamarot (yellow card) 75'; Kranjčar (yellow card) 80'	Stadium: Villa Park; Attendance: 35,790

15 December 2007 17	Sunderland	1–1	Aston Villa	County Durham
	Higginbotham 10'	Report	Maloney 73'	Stadium: Stadium Of Light; Attendance: 43,248

22 December 2007 18	Aston Villa	1–1	Manchester City	Birmingham, West Midlands
	Carew 14'	Report	Bianchi 11'	Stadium: Villa Park; Attendance: 41,455

26 December 2007 19	Chelsea	4–4	Aston Villa	Fulham, London
	Shevchenko 45+4' (pen.), 50'; Alex 66'; Carvalho (red card) 80'; Ballack 88'; A. Cole (red card) 90'	Report	Maloney 14', 44'; Knight (red card) 45'; Laursen 72'; Barry 90+2' (pen.)	Stadium: Stamford Bridge; Attendance: 41,686; Referee: Phil Dowd

29 December 2007 20	Wigan	1–2	Aston Villa	Wigan
	Bramble 28'	Report	Davies 55'; Agbonlahor 70'	Stadium: JJB Stadium; Attendance: 18,806

1 January 2008 21	Aston Villa	2–1	Tottenham	Birmingham, West Midlands
	Mellberg 41'; Laursen 81'	Report	Defoe 79'	Stadium: Villa Park; Attendance: 41,609

12 January 2008 22	Aston Villa	3–1	Reading	Birmingham, West Midlands
	Carew 22', 88'; Laursen 55'	Report	Harper 90'	Stadium: Villa Park; Attendance: 38,288

21 January 2008 23	Liverpool	2–2	Aston Villa	Merseyside
	Benayoun 19'; Crouch 88'	Report	Harewood 69'; Aurélio 72' (o.g.)	Stadium: Anfield; Attendance: 42,590

26 January 2008 24	Aston Villa	1–1	Blackburn	Birmingham, West Midlands
	Young 73'	Report	Santa Cruz 68'	Stadium: Villa Park; Attendance: 39,602

3 February 2008 25	Fulham	2–1	Aston Villa	Hammersmith
	Davies 73'; Bullard 86'	Report	Hughes 69' (o.g.)	Stadium: Craven Cottage; Attendance: 24,760

9 February 2008 26	Aston Villa	4–1	Newcastle United	Birmingham, West Midlands
	Bouma 48'; Carew 51', 72', 90' (pen.)	Report	Owen 4'	Stadium: Villa Park; Attendance: 42,640; Referee: Lee Mason

24 February 2008 27	Reading	1–2	Aston Villa	Berkshire
	Shorey 90'	Report	Young 45'; Harewood 82'	Stadium: Madejski Stadium; Attendance: 23,889

1 March 2008 28	Arsenal	1–1	Aston Villa	Highbury
	Bendtner 90'	Report	Senderos 27' (o.g.)	Stadium: Emirates Stadium; Attendance: 60,097

12 March 2008 29	Aston Villa	1–1	Middlesbrough	Birmingham, West Midlands
	Barry 74' (pen.)	Report	Downing 23'	Stadium: Villa Park; Attendance: 39,874

15 March 2008 30	Portsmouth	2–0	Aston Villa	Hampshire
	Defoe 11'; Reo-Coker 38' (o.g.)	Report		Stadium: Fratton Park; Attendance: 20,388

22 March 2008 31	Aston Villa	0–1	Sunderland	Birmingham, West Midlands
		Report	Chopra 83'	Stadium: Villa Park; Attendance: 42,640

29 March 2008 32	Manchester United	4–0	Aston Villa	Trafford, Greater Manchester
	Ronaldo 17'; Tevez 33'; Rooney 53', 70'	Report		Stadium: Old Trafford; Attendance: 75,932; Referee: Mark Halsey

5 April 2008 33	Aston Villa	4–0	Bolton Wanderers	Birmingham, West Midlands
	Barry 9', 60'; Agbonlahor 56'; Harewood 85'	Report		Stadium: Villa Park; Attendance: 37,773; Referee: Martin Atkinson

12 April 2008 34	Derby County	0–6	Aston Villa	Derby, Derbyshire
		Report	Young 25'; Carew 26'; Petrov 36'; Barry 58'; Agbonlahor 76'; Harewood 85'	Stadium: Pride Park Stadium; Attendance: 33,036; Referee: Keith Stroud

20 April 2008 35	Aston Villa	5–1	Birmingham City	Birmingham, West Midlands
	Young 28', 63'; Carew 42', 53'; Agbonlahor 78'	Report	Forssell 67'	Stadium: Villa Park; Attendance: 42,584; Referee: Mark Clattenburg

27 April 2008 36	Everton	2–2	Aston Villa	Merseyside
	Neville 54'; Yobo 84'	Report	Agbonlahor 80'; Carew 86'	Stadium: Goodison Park; Attendance: 37,936

3 May 2008 37	Aston Villa	0–2	Wigan	Birmingham, West Midlands
		Report	Valencia 52', 63'	Stadium: Villa Park; Attendance: 42,640

11 May 2008 38	West Ham United	2–2	Aston Villa	London
	Solano 8'; Ashton 88'	Report	Young 14'; Barry 58'	Stadium: Upton Park

== League Cup ==
28 August 2007 Second round	Wrexham	0–5	Aston Villa	Wrexham, North Wales
		Report	Maloney 30', 72'; Moore 52'; Reo-Coker 62'; Harewood 78'	Stadium: Racecourse Ground; Attendance: 8,221; Referee: Graham Laws

26 September 2007 Third round	Aston Villa	0–1	Leicester City	Birmingham, West Midlands
		Report	Fryatt 86'	Stadium: Villa Park; Attendance: 25,956

== FA Cup ==
5 January 2008	Aston Villa	0–2	Manchester United	Birmingham, West Midlands
		Report	Ronaldo 85' 87'	Stadium: Villa Park; Attendance: 33,630

== Players ==
=== First team squad ===
Note: Flags indicate national team as defined under FIFA eligibility rules; some limited exceptions apply. Players may hold more than one non-FIFA nationality.

No.	Pos.	Nation	Player
3	DF	NED	Wilfred Bouma
4	DF	SWE	Olof Mellberg
5	DF	DEN	Martin Laursen
6	MF	ENG	Gareth Barry
7	MF	ENG	Ashley Young
8	FW	ENG	Luke Moore
9	FW	ENG	Marlon Harewood
10	FW	NOR	John Carew
11	FW	ENG	Gabriel Agbonlahor
13	GK	ENG	Stuart Taylor
15	DF	ENG	Curtis Davies (on loan from West Bromwich Albion)

No.	Pos.	Nation	Player
16	DF	ENG	Zat Knight
17	MF	TOG	Moustapha Salifou
18	MF	ENG	Wayne Routledge
19	MF	BUL	Stilyan Petrov
20	MF	ENG	Nigel Reo-Coker
22	GK	ENG	Scott Carson (on loan from Liverpool)
23	MF	CZE	Patrik Berger
26	MF	ENG	Craig Gardner
27	MF	ENG	Isaiah Osbourne
28	MF	SCO	Shaun Maloney

=== Left club during season ===
Note: Flags indicate national team as defined under FIFA eligibility rules; some limited exceptions apply. Players may hold more than one non-FIFA nationality.

No.	Pos.	Nation	Player
21	MF	ENG	Gary Cahill (to Bolton Wanderers)

=== Reserve squad ===
The following players made most of their appearances playing for the reserves, but may have also appeared for the youth team.

Note: Flags indicate national team as defined under FIFA eligibility rules; some limited exceptions apply. Players may hold more than one non-FIFA nationality.

No.	Pos.	Nation	Player
1	GK	DEN	Thomas Sørensen
29	DF	IRL	Stephen O'Halloran
—	DF	SWE	Erik Lund
—	DF	IRL	Shane Lowry (Note: Lowry was born in Perth, Australia, but also qualifies to represent the Republic of Ireland internationally through his parents and represented them at U-17, U-19, and U-21 level before switching his international allegiance to Australia.)
—	MF	ENG	Jonathan Hogg

No.	Pos.	Nation	Player
—	MF	ENG	Sam Williams
—	MF	SUI	Yagó Bellón
—	MF	HUN	Zoltán Stieber (on loan Yeovil Town)
—	FW	SWE	Tobias Mikaelsson (on loan to Port Vale)

=== Youth squad ===
The following players made most of their appearances playing for the youth team, but may have also appeared for the reserves.

Note: Flags indicate national team as defined under FIFA eligibility rules; some limited exceptions apply. Players may hold more than one non-FIFA nationality.

No.	Pos.	Nation	Player
14	FW	ENG	Nathan Delfouneso
—	GK	ENG	Elliot Parish
—	GK	IRL	David Bevan
—	GK	AUT	Thomas Dau
—	DF	ENG	Nathan Baker
—	DF	ENG	Durrell Berry
—	DF	ENG	Daniel Bradley
—	DF	ENG	Steven Clancy (on trial to Crewe Alexandra)
—	DF	ENG	Ciaran Clark (Note: Clark was born in Harrow, England, and represented them at U-17, U-18, U-19, and U-20 level, but also qualifies to represent the Republic of Ireland internationally and would make his international debut for the Republic of Ireland in February 2011.)
—	DF	ENG	Calum Flanagan
—	DF	ENG	Matthew Roome
—	DF	ENG	Sam Simmonds
—	DF	IRL	Danny Earls
—	DF	USA	Eric Lichaj

No.	Pos.	Nation	Player
—	MF	ENG	Marc Albrighton
—	MF	ENG	Harry Forrester
—	MF	ENG	William Grocott
—	MF	ENG	Jason Lampkin
—	MF	SCO	Barry Bannan
—	MF	AUT	Dominik Hofbauer
—	MF	SUI	Damian Bellón
—	MF	AUS	Chris Herd (on loan to Port Vale and Wycombe Wanderers)
—	FW	ENG	Kofi Poyser
—	FW	ENG	Ryan Simmonds
—	FW	IRL	James Collins (Note: Collins was born in Coventry, England, but also qualifies to represent the Republic of Ireland internationally through his parents and has represented them at U-19 and U-21 level.)
—	FW	AUT	Andreas Weimann
—	DF		Will Ricketts
—			Aaron Griffiths (on trial to Coventry City)

=== Other players ===
Note: Flags indicate national team as defined under FIFA eligibility rules; some limited exceptions apply. Players may hold more than one non-FIFA nationality.

No.	Pos.	Nation	Player
—	GK	ENG	Deale Chamberlain
—	GK	IRL	Lee Boyle (contract cancelled)
—	GK	FRA	Steve Mandanda (on trial from Le Havre)
—	DF	ENG	Scott Bridges (to Banbury United)
—	DF	ENG	James Clifton
—	DF	ENG	Jordan Collins
—	DF	ENG	Ben Love
—	DF	WAL	Tomos Roberts
—	DF	IRL	Mark Power

No.	Pos.	Nation	Player
—	DF	CIV	Arsène Menessou (on trial from Le Havre)
—	MF	ENG	Richard Blythe
—	MF	ENG	Jack Dyer
—	MF	ENG	Gary Gardner
—	MF	ENG	Charlie Ward
—	MF	HUN	András Stieber
—	FW	ENG	Ethan Moore
—	FW	NIR	Adam McGurk
—			Joseph Jackman

== Kit ==
The 2007–08 season saw the unveiling of Nike as the club's kit producer, taking over from Danish firm Hummel. The deal – worth £25 million over 5 seasons – was announced on 7 February 2007, with all home, away and goalkeeper kits being unveiled on 17 July 2007. The home shirt was made available to purchase on 8 August 2007, and the away on 4 October 2007. A charcoal and white third shirt was unveiled and released in November 2007. The home shirt followed the club's usual template of a claret body and blue arms, with a white "AVFC" banner and printed lion featured on the hem and back of the collar respectively. The away shirt featured a white body, with blue pinstripes – in a similar style to that of the 1982 European Cup winners' jersey (which featured claret stripes in place of the modern blue alternative). The third shirt was charcoal with white piping. The home goalkeeper shirt featured horizontal stripes, with different alternating shades of grey. The away replicated this style, with different shades of yellow.

Gibraltar-based betting firm 32Red continued their sponsorship of the club, however with the contract in its last year, Villa are expected to announce another deal for the forthcoming 2008–09 season.

== Crest ==
A new crest was revealed on 2 May 2007 to be introduced for the 2007–08 season. The new crest included a star to represent the European Cup win in 1982, and has a light blue background behind Villa's "lion rampant." The traditional motto "Prepared" remained in the crest, and the name "Aston Villa" was shortened to AVFC, FC having been omitted from the previous crest. Randy Lerner petitioned fans to help with the design of the new crest.

== Transfers ==
=== Summer transfer window ===
Following the transfer of prolific striker Juan Pablo Ángel to New York Red Bulls in April, several Villa first-teamers followed the Colombian out of the door in the summer of 2007. Gavin McCann joined Bolton Wanderers in £1 million deal on 12 June, then a fortnight later, versatile defender Aaron Hughes left for Fulham, also in a £1 million deal. McCann was joined by Jlloyd Samuel – who had spent much of the previous season on the bench for the Midlanders – at Bolton, signing on a free transfer when his contract expired on 1 July. However, the two most surprising deals occurred with two academy players, in Steven Davis and Liam Ridgewell. Davis – who had won Player of the Year for the club in the 2005–06 season – signed for Fulham on 5 July for an undisclosed fee. Liam Ridgewell made the trip across the city to Birmingham City on 3 August, in a £2 million move. Other moves saw midfielder Lee Hendrie end his 14-year association with the club in a free transfer to Sheffield United, Phil Bardsley returned to Manchester United after a 13-game loan stint at the club, whilst Stephen Henderson, Bobby Olejnik, Mark Delaney, Scott Bridges and Eric Djemba-Djemba all left Villa Park.

Villa clinched their first transfer on 5 July with the £8.5 million signing of midfield battler Nigel Reo-Coker from West Ham United. 11 days later, Marlon Harewood also moved from Upton Park, for an undisclosed fee. Scott Carson was the next to arrive on 10 August, in a loan switch from Liverpool (although some media sources claim a fee of £2 million up front was agreed), before defenders Zat Knight and Curtis Davies both signed on 29 and 31 August respectively. Knight signed for his hometown club for a fee of £3.5 million from Fulham, whilst Davies signed on a season-long loan from local rivals West Bromwich Albion. Other deals saw Austrian youngsters Andreas Weimann and Dominik Hofbauer sign, as well as Eric Lichaj, Harry Forrester and Togolese international Moustapha Salifou.

=== Winter transfer window ===
After failing to find a suitor in the summer, Gary Cahill was allowed to leave on a loan deal to Sheffield United in September; however, he joined Bolton on a permanent deal on 30 January for an undisclosed fee. Youngsters Chris Herd, Tobias Mikaelsson, Stephen O'Halloran and Zoltán Stieber were all farmed out on loan. The biggest news, however, was that Swedish international defender Olof Mellberg, was to join Italian giants Juventus on a free transfer at the end of the season.

Unlike the summer transfer window, Aston Villa were extremely quiet in the winter equivalent, purchasing just one senior player in Wayne Routledge (£1.25 million) from Tottenham Hotspur. He was also followed by youngsters Thomas Dau and Lance Heslop.

=== Transferred in ===
Date	Pos	Player	From	Fee	Ref.
June 2007		(Austria) Andreas Weimann	(Austria) Rapid Wien	Undisclosed	
5 July 2007	CM	Nigel Reo-Coker	West Ham United	£8,500,000	
11 July 2007	AM	Harry Forrester	Watford	Undisclosed	
17 July 2007	CF	Marlon Harewood	West Ham United	£4,000,000	
1 August 2007	DF	(United States) Eric Lichaj	(United States) University of North Carolina	Undisclosed	
29 August 2007	CB	Zat Knight	Fulham	£3,500,000	
31 August 2007	AM	(Togo) Moustapha Salifou	(Germany) FC Wil	£750,000	
4 December 2007		(Austria) Thomas Dau	(Austria) SV Schwechat Juniors	Undisclosed	
December 2007		(New Zealand) Lance Heslop	(New Zealand) Auckland City	Undisclosed	
30 January 2008	RM	Wayne Routledge	Tottenham Hotspur	£1,250,000	

=== Loaned in ===
Date	Pos	Player	From	Loan End	Ref.
10 August 2007	GK	Scott Carson	Liverpool	31 May 2008	
31 August 2007	CB	Curtis Davies	West Bromwich Albion	31 May 2008	

=== Transferred out ===
Date	Pos	Player	To	Fee	Ref.
8 June 2007	CM	Gavin McCann	Bolton Wanderers	£1,000,000	
27 June 2007	RB	(Northern Ireland) Aaron Hughes	Fulham	£1,000,000	
1 July 2007	RB	(Wales) Mark Delaney	Retired	—N/a	
1 July 2007	CF	Chris Sutton	Retired	—N/a	
1 July 2007	DM	(Cameroon) Eric Djemba-Djemba	Qatar SC	Free transfer	
1 July 2007	GK	(Republic of Ireland) Stephen Henderson	Bristol City	Free transfer	
1 July 2007	RM	Lee Hendrie	Sheffield United	Free transfer	
1 July 2007	GK	(Austria) Bobby Olejnik	(Scotland) Falkirk	Free transfer	
1 July 2007	LB	(Trinidad and Tobago) Jlloyd Samuel	Bolton Wanderers	Free transfer	
5 July 2007	CM	(Northern Ireland) Steven Davis	Fulham	£2,000,000	
3 August 2007	CB	Liam Ridgewell	Birmingham City	£2,000,000	
30 January 2008	CB	Gary Cahill	Bolton Wanderers	£5,000,000	

=== Loaned out ===
Date	Pos	Player	To	Loan End	Ref.
19 September 2007	CB	Gary Cahill	Sheffield United	16 January 2008	
16 January 2008	LB	(Republic of Ireland) Stephen O'Halloran	Southampton	16 February 2008	
28 February 2008	LB	(Republic of Ireland) Stephen O'Halloran	Leeds United	31 May 2008	

=== Overall transfer activity ===
==== Expenditure ====
▼£18,000,000

==== Income ====
▲£11,000,000

==== Balance ====
▼£7,000,000

== Pre-season results ==
Date	Opponent	Venue	Result F – A	Competition	Scorers
25 July 2007	Toronto FC (Canada)	A	4–2	Friendly match	Moore (3), Carew
28 July 2007	Columbus Crew (United States)	A	3–1	Friendly match	Young, Barry, Moore
01/08/2007	Stoke City	A	2–0	Friendly match	Berger, Agbonlahor
04/08/2007	Internazionale (Italy)	H	3–0	Friendly match	Barry (2), Lausren
07/08/2007	Walsall	A	1–1	Friendly match	Boertien (og)

== Players of the year ==
At the end of season awards dinner, Martin Laursen was announced as the Supporters' Player of the Year, whilst Gabriel Agbonlahor was the Supporter's and Player's Young Player of the Year.

== Statistics ==
=== Appearances and goals ===
As of end of season

No.	Pos	Nat	Player	Total		Premiership		League Cup		FA Cup	
No.	Pos	Nat	Player	Apps	Goals	Apps	Goals	Apps	Goals	Apps	Goals
Goalkeepers
13	GK	(England) ENG	Stuart Taylor	6	0	3+1	0	2	0	0	0
22	GK	(England) ENG	Scott Carson	36	0	35	0	0	0	1	0
Defenders
3	DF	(Netherlands) NED	Wilfred Bouma	39	1	38	1	0	0	1	0
4	DF	(Sweden) SWE	Olof Mellberg	37	2	33+1	2	2	0	1	0
5	DF	(Denmark) DEN	Martin Laursen	39	6	38	6	0	0	1	0
15	DF	(England) ENG	Curtis Davies	14	1	9+3	1	1	0	1	0
16	DF	(England) ENG	Zat Knight	28	1	25+2	1	1	0	0	0
26	DF	(England) ENG	Craig Gardner	25	3	15+8	3	1	0	0+1	0
Midfielders
6	MF	(England) ENG	Gareth Barry	40	9	37	9	2	0	1	0
7	MF	(England) ENG	Ashley Young	39	9	37	9	0+1	0	1	0
17	MF	(Togo) TOG	Moustapha Salifou	4	0	0+4	0	0	0	0	0
18	MF	(England) ENG	Wayne Routledge	1	0	0+1	0	0	0	0	0
19	MF	(Bulgaria) BUL	Stilian Petrov	31	1	22+6	1	1+1	0	1	0
20	MF	(England) ENG	Nigel Reo-Coker	39	1	36	0	2	1	1	0
23	MF	(Czech Republic) CZE	Patrik Berger	9	0	0+8	0	0+1	0	0	0
27	MF	(England) ENG	Isaiah Osbourne	10	0	1+7	0	2	0	0	0
28	MF	(Scotland) SCO	Shaun Maloney	25	6	11+11	4	2	2	0+1	0
Forwards
8	FW	(England) ENG	Luke Moore	18	2	8+7	1	1+1	1	0+1	0
9	FW	(England) ENG	Marlon Harewood	25	6	1+22	5	2	1	0	0
10	FW	(Norway) NOR	John Carew	33	13	32	13	0	0	1	0
11	FW	(England) ENG	Gabriel Agbonlahor	40	11	37	11	2	0	1	0
Players transferred or loaned out during the season
21	DF	(England) ENG	Gary Cahill	2	0	0+1	0	1	0	0	0

Last updated: September 2017
Source: Competitions

=== Topscorers ===
- (Norway) John Carew – 13
- (England) Gabriel Agbonlahor – 11
- (England) Ashley Young – 9
- (England) Gareth Barry – 8
- (Denmark) Martin Laursen – 6
