= 2008–09 Aston Villa F.C. season =

English football club season

Aston Villa
2008–09 season
- Chairman: Randy Lerner
- Manager: Martin O'Neill
- Premier League: 6th
- FA Cup: Fifth round
- League Cup: Third round
- UEFA Cup: Round of 32
- Top goalscorer: League: Gabriel Agbonlahor (12); All: John Carew (15)
- Highest home attendance: 42,585 vs Manchester United, Arsenal, Chelsea, Newcastle United
- Lowest home attendance: 21,541 vs Queens Park Rangers
| Home colours | Away colours | Third colours |

The 2008-09 season was Aston Villa's 17th season in the Premier League. The 2008–09 Premier League season was Villa's 134th season in English football. It was the club's 98th season in the top-flight and their 21st consecutive season in the top flight. They were managed by Martin O'Neill – in his third season since replacing David O'Leary. The 2008–09 season was the first spell in European competition for O'Neill, and the first for Villa, in 6 seasons.

The club's first summer signing was the permanent capture of on-loan West Brom centre-back, Curtis Davies, in July, while their first sale was made in May, as Luke Moore completed a move to West Brom in an initial £3 million deal, after he had spent the second half of the 2007–08 season there on loan.

The fixtures for the 2008–09 season were announced on Monday 16 June 2008, with Aston Villa beginning at home against Manchester City and finishing the season at home to Newcastle. Due to Birmingham's relegation at the end of the 2007–08 season, there was no Second City derby, however they faced local rivals West Brom on 20 September 2008 at The Hawthorns and on 10 January 2009 at home.

In December 2008, Everton player and boyhood Villa fan, Joleon Lescott put two past Villa and still lost the match following Ashley Young's "brilliant" equalizer.

After 25 games, having qualified for the UEFA Cup as joint winners of the Intertoto Cup, the club were third in the table on 51 points, 2 points above Chelsea on level games and 7 points above Arsenal in 5th place and on course for a place in the Champions League for the first time since 1983. O'Neill decided to prioritise Champions League qualification above all else, fielding a virtual reserve side for a UEFA Cup game against CSKA Moscow which was subsequently lost. Following this, Villa failed to win any of the next 8 league games and improving form for Arsenal & Chelsea meant that Villa failed to reach the top 4.

== Kit ==
| Kit Supplier | Sponsor |
|---|---|
| Nike | Acorns* |

*Villa passed up sponsorship for the 2008–09 season and instead displayed the children's hospice charity, Acorns.

== Matches ==
=== Pre-season friendlies ===
| Date | Opponents | H/A | Result | Scorers | Venue | Ref. |
|---|---|---|---|---|---|---|
| 10 July 2008 | FC Wil 1900 (Switzerland) | A | 6–0 | Harewood (2), Carew, Delfouneso, Maloney, Routledge | Sportpark Bergholz | |
| 12 July 2008 | FC Zürich (Switzerland) | A | 1–2 | Agbonlahor | Letzigrund | |
| 15 July 2008 | Lincoln City | A | 1–3 | Carew | Sincil Bank | |
| 22 July 2008 | Walsall | A | 3–2 | Maloney (2), Routledge | Bescot Stadium | |
| 2 August 2008 | Reading | A | 1–1 | Agbonlahor | Madejski Stadium | |
| 6 August 2008 | Real Balompédica Linense (Spain) | A | 1–1 | Carew | Estadio Municipal de La Línea de la Concepción | |
| 8 August 2008 | UD Marbella (Spain) | A | 2–0 | Delfouneso, Gardner | Estadio Municipal de Marbella | |

=== Premier League ===
| Date | Opponents | H/A | Result | Scorers | Venue | Attendance | Ref. |
|---|---|---|---|---|---|---|---|
| 17 August 2008 | Manchester City | H | 4–2 | Carew, Agbonlahor (3) | Villa Park | 39,955 | |
| 23 August 2008 | Stoke City | A | 2–3 | Carew, Laursen | Britannia Stadium | 27,500 | |
| 31 August 2008 | Liverpool | H | 0–0 | | Villa Park | 41,647 | |
| 15 September 2008 | Tottenham Hotspur | A | 2–1 | Reo-Coker, A.Young | White Hart Lane | 36,076 | |
| 21 September 2008 | West Bromwich Albion | A | 2–1 | Carew, Agbonlahor | The Hawthorns | 26,011 | |
| 27 September 2008 | Sunderland | H | 2–1 | A.Young, Carew | Villa Park | 38,706 | |
| 5 October 2008 | Chelsea | A | 0–2 | | Stamford Bridge | 41,593 | |
| 18 October 2008 | Portsmouth | H | 0–0 | | Villa Park | 37,660 | |
| 26 October 2008 | Wigan Athletic | A | 4–0 | Barry, Agbonlahor, Carew, Sidwell | JJB Stadium | 20,249 | |
| 29 October 2008 | Blackburn Rovers | H | 3–2 | L.Young, Barry, Agbonlahor | Villa Park | 35,985 | |
| 3 November 2008 | Newcastle United | A | 0–2 | | St James' Park | 44,567 | |
| 9 November 2008 | Middlesbrough | H | 1–2 | Sidwell | Villa Park | 36,672 | |
| 15 November 2008 | Arsenal | A | 2–0 | Clichy (OG), Agbonlahor | Emirates Stadium | 60,047 | |
| 22 November 2008 | Manchester United | H | 0–0 | | Villa Park | 42,585 | |
| 29 November 2008 | Fulham | H | 0–0 | | Villa Park | 36,625 | |
| 7 December 2008 | Everton | A | 3–2 | Sidwell, A.Young (2) | Goodison Park | 31,922 | |
| 13 December 2008 | Bolton Wanderers | H | 4–2 | Agbonlahor (2), Davies (OG), A.Young | Villa Park | 35,134 | |
| 20 December 2008 | West Ham United | A | 1–0 | Neill (OG) | Boleyn Ground | 31,353 | |
| 26 December 2008 | Arsenal | H | 2–2 | Barry (pen), Knight | Villa Park | 42,585 | |
| 30 December 2008 | Hull City | A | 1–0 | Zayatte (OG) | KC Stadium | 24,727 | |
| 10 January 2009 | West Bromwich Albion | H | 2–1 | Davies, Agbonlahor | Villa Park | 41,757 | |
| 17 January 2009 | Sunderland | A | 2–1 | Milner, Barry (pen) | Stadium of Light | 40,350 | |
| 27 January 2009 | Portsmouth | A | 1–0 | Heskey | Fratton Park | 19,073 | |
| 31 January 2009 | Wigan Athletic | H | 0–0 | | Villa Park | 41,766 | |
| 7 February 2009 | Blackburn Rovers | A | 2–0 | Milner, Agbonlahor | Ewood Park | 24,267 | |
| 21 February 2009 | Chelsea | H | 0–1 | | Villa Park | 42,585 | |
| 1 March 2009 | Stoke City | H | 2–2 | Petrov, Carew | Villa Park | 39,641 | |
| 4 March 2009 | Manchester City | A | 0–2 | | City of Manchester Stadium | 40,137 | |
| 15 March 2009 | Tottenham Hotspur | H | 1–2 | Carew | Villa Park | 41,205 | |
| 22 March 2009 | Liverpool | A | 0–5 | | Anfield | 44,131 | |
| 5 April 2009 | Manchester United | A | 2–3 | Carew, Agbonlahor | Old Trafford | 75,409 | |
| 12 April 2009 | Everton | H | 3–3 | Carew, Milner, Barry (PEN) | Villa Park | 40,188 | |
| 18 April 2009 | West Ham United | H | 1–1 | Heskey | Villa Park | 39,534 | |
| 25 April 2009 | Bolton Wanderers | A | 1–1 | A.Young | Reebok Stadium | 21,709 | |
| 4 May 2009 | Hull City | H | 1–0 | Carew | Villa Park | 39,607 | |
| 9 May 2009 | Fulham | A | 1–3 | A.Young | Craven Cottage | 25,660 | |
| 16 May 2009 | Middlesbrough | A | 1–1 | Carew | Riverside Stadium | 27,261 | |
| 24 May 2009 | Newcastle United | H | 1–0 | Duff (OG) | Villa Park | 42,585 | |

=== FA Cup ===
| Round | Date | Opponents | H/A | Result | Scorers | Venue | Attendance | Ref. |
|---|---|---|---|---|---|---|---|---|
| Third round | 4 January 2009 | Gillingham | A | 2–1 | Milner (2) | Priestfield Stadium | 10,107 | |
| Fourth round | 24 January 2009 | Doncaster Rovers | A | 0–0 | | Keepmoat Stadium | 13,517 | |
| Fourth round replay | 4 February 2009 | Doncaster Rovers | H | 3–1 | Sidwell, Carew, Delfouneso | Villa Park | 24,203 | |
| Fifth round | 15 February 2009 | Everton | A | 1–3 | Milner | Goodison Park | 35,439 | |

=== Football League Cup ===
| Round | Date | Opponents | H/A | Result | Scorers | Venue | Attendance | Ref. |
|---|---|---|---|---|---|---|---|---|
| Third round | 24 September 2008 | Queens Park Rangers | H | 0–1 | | Villa Park | 21,541 | |

=== UEFA Cup ===
| Round | Date | Opponents | H/A | Result | Scorers | Venue | Attendance | Ref. |
|---|---|---|---|---|---|---|---|---|
| UEFA Intertoto Cup – 3rd round | 19 July 2008 | Odense Boldklub (Denmark) | A | 2–2 | Carew, Laursen | Fionia Park | 12,000 | |
| UEFA Intertoto Cup – 3rd round | 26 July 2008 | Odense Boldklub (Denmark) | H | 1–0 | A.Young | Villa Park | 34,394 | |
| UEFA Cup – Second qualifying round | 14 August 2008 | Fimleikafélag Hafnarfjarðar (Iceland) | A | 4–1 | Barry, A.Young, Agbonlahor, Laursen | Laugardalsvöllur | 2,200 | |
| UEFA Cup – Second qualifying round | 28 August 2008 | Fimleikafélag Hafnarfjarðar (Iceland) | H | 1–1 | Gardner | Villa Park | 25,415 | |
| UEFA Cup – First round | 18 September 2008 | PFC Litex Lovech (Bulgaria) | A | 3–1 | Reo-Coker, Barry, Petrov | Lovech Stadium | 7,000 | |
| UEFA Cup – First round | 2 October 2008 | PFC Litex Lovech (Bulgaria) | H | 1–1 | Harewood | Villa Park | 27,230 | |
| UEFA Cup – Group Stage | 23 October 2008 | Ajax (Netherlands) | H | 2–1 | Laursen, Barry | Villa Park | 36,657 | |
| UEFA Cup – Group Stage | 6 November 2008 | Slavia Prague (Czech Republic) | A | 1–0 | Carew | Synot Tip Arena | 22,322 | |
| UEFA Cup – Group Stage | 4 December 2008 | MŠK Žilina (Slovenia) | H | 1–2 | Delfouneso | Villa Park | 28,797 | |
| UEFA Cup – Group Stage | 17 December 2008 | Hamburger SV (Germany) | A | 1–3 | Delfouneso | HSH Nordbank Arena | 49,121 | |
| UEFA Cup – Round of 32 | 18 February 2009 | CSKA Moscow (Russia) | H | 1–1 | Carew | Villa Park | 38,038 | |
| UEFA Cup – Round of 32 | 26 February 2009 | CSKA Moscow (Russia) | A | 0–2 | | Luzhniki Stadium | 25,650 | |

== Transfers ==
=== Transferred in ===
| Date | Pos | Player | From | Fee |
|---|---|---|---|---|
| 3 July 2008 | CB | Curtis Davies | West Bromwich Albion | £8,000,000 |
| 10 July 2008 | CM | Steve Sidwell | Chelsea | £5,000,000 |
| 26 July 2008 | GK | (United States) Brad Friedel | Blackburn Rovers | £2,500,000 |
| 1 August 2008 | GK | (United States) Brad Guzan | (United States) Chivas USA | £600,000 |
| 7 August 2008 | LB | Nicky Shorey | Reading | £2,000,000 |
| 8 August 2008 | RB | Luke Young | Middlesbrough | £6,000,000 |
| 12 August 2008 | CB | (Spain) Carlos Cuéllar | (Scotland) Rangers | £7,800,000 |
| 30 August 2008 | RM | James Milner | Newcastle United | £12,000,000 |
| 23 January 2009 | CF | Emile Heskey | Wigan Athletic | £3,500,000 |
| | | | | £45,400,000 |

Record

=== Loaned in ===
| Date | Pos | Player | From | Loan End |

=== Transferred out ===
| Date | Pos | Player | To | Fee |
|---|---|---|---|---|
| 28 May 2008 | CF | Luke Moore | West Bromwich Albion | £3,000,000 |
| 1 July 2008 | AM | (Czech Republic) Patrik Berger | (Czech Republic) Sparta Prague | Free transfer |
| 1 July 2008 | CB | (Sweden) Olof Mellberg | (Italy) Juventus | Free transfer |
| 1 July 2008 | GK | (Denmark) Thomas Sørensen | Stoke City | Free transfer |
| 22 August 2008 | AM | (Scotland) Shaun Maloney | (Scotland) Celtic | £3,000,000 |
| 3 January 2009 | LM | Wayne Routledge | Queens Park Rangers | £600,000 |
| | | | | £6,600,000 |

=== Loaned out ===
| Date | Pos | Player | To | Loan End |
|---|---|---|---|---|
| 23 September 2008 | GK | (Republic of Ireland) David Bevan | Tamworth | 20 December 2008 |
| 3 November 2008 | CF | Sam Williams | Colchester United | 30 November 2008 |
| 5 November 2008 | LB | (Republic of Ireland) Stephen O'Halloran | (Wales) Swansea City | 1 January 2009 |
| 20 November 2008 | LM | Wayne Routledge | (Wales) Cardiff City | 2 January 2009 |
| 30 January 2009 | CF | Sam Williams | Walsall | 15 February 2009 |
| 3 March 2009 | CM | Isaiah Osbourne | Nottingham Forest | 31 May 2009 |
| 9 March 2009 | CF | Sam Williams | Brentford | 31 May 2009 |
| 13 March 2009 | CM | (Scotland) Barry Bannan | Derby County | 31 May 2009 |
| 13 March 2009 | GK | Stuart Taylor | (Wales) Cardiff City | 31 May 2009 |
| 23 March 2009 | CF | Marlon Harewood | Wolverhampton Wanderers | 31 May 2009 |

=== Overall transfer activity ===
==== Expenditure ====
▼£45,400,000

==== Income ====
▲£6,600,000

==== Balance ====
▼£38,800,000

== Players ==
=== First-team squad ===
Squad at end of season

Note: Flags indicate national team as defined under FIFA eligibility rules; some limited exceptions apply. Players may hold more than one non-FIFA nationality.

| No. | Pos. | Nation | Player |
|---|---|---|---|
| 1 | GK | USA | Brad Friedel |
| 2 | DF | ENG | Luke Young |
| 3 | DF | NED | Wilfred Bouma |
| 4 | MF | ENG | Steve Sidwell |
| 6 | MF | ENG | Gareth Barry (vice-captain) |
| 7 | MF | ENG | Ashley Young |
| 8 | MF | ENG | James Milner |
| 9 | FW | ENG | Marlon Harewood |
| 10 | FW | NOR | John Carew |
| 11 | FW | ENG | Gabriel Agbonlahor |
| 13 | GK | ENG | Stuart Taylor |
| 14 | FW | ENG | Nathan Delfouneso |

| No. | Pos. | Nation | Player |
|---|---|---|---|
| 15 | DF | ENG | Curtis Davies |
| 16 | DF | ENG | Zat Knight |
| 17 | MF | TOG | Moustapha Salifou |
| 18 | FW | ENG | Emile Heskey |
| 19 | MF | BUL | Stiliyan Petrov |
| 20 | MF | ENG | Nigel Reo-Coker |
| 21 | DF | ENG | Nicky Shorey |
| 22 | GK | USA | Brad Guzan |
| 24 | DF | ESP | Carlos Cuéllar |
| 26 | MF | ENG | Craig Gardner |
| 27 | MF | ENG | Isaiah Osbourne |
| 45 | MF | ENG | Marc Albrighton |
| 46 | MF | SCO | Barry Bannan |

=== Left club during season ===
Note: Flags indicate national team as defined under FIFA eligibility rules; some limited exceptions apply. Players may hold more than one non-FIFA nationality.

| No. | Pos. | Nation | Player |
|---|---|---|---|
| 5 | DF | DEN | Martin Laursen (captain; retired) |
| 9 | FW | ENG | Marlon Harewood (on loan to Wolverhampton Wanderers) |
| 18 | MF | ENG | Wayne Routledge (to Queens Park Rangers) |
| 27 | MF | ENG | Isaiah Osbourne (on loan to Nottingham Forest) |

| No. | Pos. | Nation | Player |
|---|---|---|---|
| 28 | MF | SCO | Shaun Maloney (to Celtic) |
| 29 | DF | IRL | Stephen O'Halloran (on loan to Swansea City) |
| 46 | MF | SCO | Barry Bannan (on loan to Derby County) |

=== Reserve squad ===
The following players made most of their appearances for the reserve team this season, and did not appear for the first team.

Note: Flags indicate national team as defined under FIFA eligibility rules; some limited exceptions apply. Players may hold more than one non-FIFA nationality.

| No. | Pos. | Nation | Player |
|---|---|---|---|
| 29 | DF | IRL | Stephen O'Halloran |
| 43 | DF | USA | Eric Lichaj |
| 47 | DF | ENG | Ciaran Clark |
| 48 | DF | ENG | Nathan Baker |
| 49 | MF | AUS | Chris Herd |

| No. | Pos. | Nation | Player |
|---|---|---|---|
| 51 | DF | IRL | Shane Lowry |
| — | GK | ENG | Elliot Parish |
| — | MF | HUN | Zoltán Stieber |
| — | FW | ENG | Sam Williams |
| — | FW | SWE | Tobias Mikaelsson (on trial to BK Häcken) |

=== Youth squad ===
The following players made most of their appearances for the youth team this season, but may have also appeared for the reserves.

Note: Flags indicate national team as defined under FIFA eligibility rules; some limited exceptions apply. Players may hold more than one non-FIFA nationality.

| No. | Pos. | Nation | Player |
|---|---|---|---|
| — | GK | NIR | Conor Devlin (on loan from Manchester United) |
| — | GK | AUT | Thomas Dau |
| — | GK | SUI | Benjamin Siegrist |
| — | GK | KOS | Aldi Haxhia (on loan from Chelsea) |
| — | DF | ENG | Durrell Berry |
| — | DF | ENG | Daniel Bradley |
| — | DF | ENG | Ellis Deeney |
| — | DF | ENG | Ben Love |
| — | DF | ENG | Matthew Roome |
| — | DF | ENG | Sam Simmonds |
| — | DF | WAL | Tomos Roberts |

| No. | Pos. | Nation | Player |
|---|---|---|---|
| — | DF | IRL | Derrick Williams (Note: Williams was born in Hamburg, Germany, but also qualified to represent the Republic of Ireland internationally through his mother and represented them at U-19 and U-21 level before making his international debut for the Republic of Ireland in May 2018.) |
| — | MF | ENG | Richard Blythe |
| — | MF | ENG | Jack Dyer |
| — | MF | ENG | Jason Lampkin |
| — | MF | AUT | Dominik Hofbauer |
| — | MF | HUN | András Stieber |
| — | FW | ENG | Ethan Moore |
| — | FW | ENG | Kofi Poyser |
| — | FW | ENG | Ryan Simmonds |
| — | FW | IRL | James Collins (Note: Collins was born in Coventry, England, but also qualified to represent the Republic of Ireland internationally through his parents and represented them at U-19 and U-21 level.) |
| — | FW | AUT | Andreas Weimann |

=== Other players ===
The following players did not appear for any squad this season.

Note: Flags indicate national team as defined under FIFA eligibility rules; some limited exceptions apply. Players may hold more than one non-FIFA nationality.

| No. | Pos. | Nation | Player |
|---|---|---|---|
| — | GK | ENG | Calum Barrett |
| — | GK | ENG | Matt Coton |
| — | GK | IRL | David Bevan (on loan to Tamworth) |
| — | DF | ENG | James Clifton |
| — | DF | ENG | Jordan Collins |
| — | DF | ENG | Calum Flanagan |
| — | DF | ENG | Fred Holtom |
| — | DF | IRL | Richard Bryan (Note: Bryan was born in Birmingham, England, but also qualified to represent the Republic of Ireland internationally and represented them at U-16 and U-17 level.) |
| — | DF | NED | Arsenio Halfhuid |

| No. | Pos. | Nation | Player |
|---|---|---|---|
| — | MF | ENG | Emmitt Delfouneso |
| — | MF | ENG | Harry Forrester |
| — | MF | ENG | Gary Gardner |
| — | MF | ENG | William Grocott |
| — | MF | ENG | Ebby Nelson-Addy |
| — | MF | ENG | Charlie Ward |
| — | FW | NIR | Adam McGurk |
| — | FW | TUR | Umit Eminoglu (Note: Eminoglu was born in Solihull, England, but also qualified to represent Turkey internationally and represented them at U-16 level.) |

=== Trialists ===
Note: Flags indicate national team as defined under FIFA eligibility rules; some limited exceptions apply. Players may hold more than one non-FIFA nationality.

| No. / Pos. / Nation / Player; — / MF / ENG / Alex Witham | No. / Pos. / Nation / Player; — / MF / AUS / Reece Caira (on trial from Blacktown City) |

== Competitions ==
=== Overall ===
- Premier League: Sixth
- League Cup: Third round (knocked out by Q.P.R.)
- FA Cup: Fifth round (knocked out by Everton)
- UEFA Intertoto Cup: Joint-winner, qualified for UEFA Cup
- UEFA Cup: Round of 32 (knocked out by CSKA Moscow)

| Competition | Started round | Current position / round | Final position / round | First match | Last match |
|---|---|---|---|---|---|
| Premier League | — | — | 6th | 17 August 2008 | 24 May 2009 |
| Football League Cup | Third round | — | Third round | 24 September 2008 | 24 September 2008 |
| FA Cup | 3rd round | — | 5th round | 4 January 2009 | 15 February 2009 |

Updated to match played 12 June 2008
Source: Competitions

=== Premier League ===
==== Final league table ====
| Pos | Team | Pld | W | D | L | GF | GA | GD | Pts | Qualification or relegation |
|---|---|---|---|---|---|---|---|---|---|---|
| 4 | Arsenal | 38 | 20 | 12 | 6 | 68 | 37 | +31 | 72 | Qualification for the Champions League play-off round |
| 5 | Everton | 38 | 17 | 12 | 9 | 55 | 37 | +18 | 63 | Qualification for the Europa League play-off round (Note: Since both finalists of the FA Cup (Chelsea and Everton) and the League Cup winners (Manchester United) qualified for the European competitions based on their league position, the sixth-placed team (Aston Villa) received a berth in the Europa League play-off round and the seventh-placed team (Fulham) received a berth in the Europa League third qualifying round.) |
| 6 | Aston Villa | 38 | 17 | 11 | 10 | 54 | 48 | +6 | 62 | Qualification for the Europa League play-off round |
| 7 | Fulham | 38 | 14 | 11 | 13 | 39 | 34 | +5 | 53 | Qualification for the Europa League third qualifying round |
| 8 | Tottenham Hotspur | 38 | 14 | 9 | 15 | 45 | 45 | 0 | 51 | |

Source: Barclays Premier League
Rules for classification: 1) points; 2) goal difference; 3) number of goals scored.

==== Results summary ====
| Overall | | | | | | | | Home | | | | | | Away | | | | | |
| Pld | W | D | L | GF | GA | GD | Pts | W | D | L | GF | GA | GD | W | D | L | GF | GA | GD |
|---|---|---|---|---|---|---|---|---|---|---|---|---|---|---|---|---|---|---|---|
| 38 | 17 | 11 | 10 | 54 | 48 | +6 | 62 | 7 | 9 | 3 | 27 | 21 | +6 | 10 | 2 | 7 | 27 | 27 | 0 |

== Statistics ==
=== Player statistics ===
==== First-Team ====
| No. | Pos. | Nationality | Player | Apps | Goals | Assists | YC | RC | Total Apps | Total Goals |
|---|---|---|---|---|---|---|---|---|---|---|
| 1 | GK | United States | Brad Friedel | 46 | 0 | 0 | 1 | 1 | 46 | 0 |
| 2 | DF | England | Luke Young | 43 | 1 | 0 | 7 | 0 | 43 | 1 |
| 3 | DF | Netherlands | Wilfred Bouma | 2 | 0 | 0 | 0 | 0 | 90 | 1 |
| 4 | MF | England | Steve Sidwell | 25 | 4 | 1 | 6 | 1 | 25 | 4 |
| 5 | DF | Denmark | Martin Laursen | 24 | 4 | 2 | 1 | 0 | 91 | 11 |
| 6 | MF | England | Gareth Barry | 48 | 8 | 9 | 10 | 0 | 440 | 52 |
| 7 | MF | England | Ashley Young | 48 | 9 | 15 | 8 | 1 | 100 | 19 |
| 8 | MF | England | James Milner | 43 | 6 | 8 | 7 | 0 | 79 | 9 |
| 9 | FW | England | Marlon Harewood | 15 | 1 | 3 | 1 | 0 | 40 | 7 |
| 10 | FW | Norway | John Carew | 34 | 15 | 4 | 3 | 0 | 78 | 31 |
| 11 | FW | England | Gabriel Agbonlahor | 48 | 13 | 10 | 4 | 0 | 139 | 35 |
| 13 | GK | England | Stuart Taylor | 2 | 0 | 0 | 0 | 0 | 17 | 0 |
| 14 | FW | England | Nathan Delfouneso | 13 | 3 | 0 | 1 | 0 | 13 | 3 |
| 15 | DF | England | Curtis Davies | 45 | 1 | 1 | 3 | 0 | 59 | 2 |
| 16 | DF | England | Zat Knight | 26 | 1 | 0 | 1 | 0 | 54 | 2 |
| 17 | MF | Togo | Moustapha Salifou | 9 | 0 | 1 | 0 | 0 | 13 | 0 |
| 18 | FW | England | Emile Heskey | 14 | 2 | 0 | 0 | 0 | 14 | 2 |
| 19 | MF | Bulgaria | Stiliyan Petrov | 47 | 2 | 4 | 9 | 0 | 112 | 5 |
| 20 | MF | England | Nigel Reo-Coker | 36 | 2 | 1 | 4 | 0 | 75 | 3 |
| 21 | DF | England | Nicky Shorey | 33 | 0 | 2 | 2 | 0 | 33 | 0 |
| 22 | GK | United States | Brad Guzan | 8 | 0 | 0 | 1 | 0 | 8 | 0 |
| 24 | DF | Spain | Carlos Cuéllar | 36 | 0 | 0 | 4 | 0 | 36 | 0 |
| 26 | MF | England | Craig Gardner | 30 | 1 | 2 | 4 | 0 | 77 | 6 |
| 27 | MF | England | Isaiah Osbourne | 6 | 0 | 0 | 1 | 0 | 29 | 0 |
| 29 | DF | Republic of Ireland | Stephen O'Halloran | 0 | 0 | 0 | 0 | 0 | 0 | 0 |
| 43 | DF | United States | Eric Lichaj | 0 | 0 | 0 | 0 | 0 | 0 | 0 |
| 45 | MF | England | Marc Albrighton | 1 | 0 | 0 | 1 | 0 | 1 | 0 |
| 46 | MF | Scotland | Barry Bannan | 2 | 0 | 0 | 1 | 0 | 2 | 0 |
| 47 | DF | England | Ciaran Clark | 0 | 0 | 0 | 0 | 0 | 0 | 0 |
| 48 | DF | England | Nathan Baker | 0 | 0 | 0 | 0 | 0 | 0 | 0 |
| 49 | MF | Australia | Chris Herd | 0 | 0 | 0 | 0 | 0 | 0 | 0 |
| 51 | MF | (Republic of Ireland) Ireland | Shane Lowry | 0 | 0 | 0 | 0 | 0 | 0 | 0 |

- Last Update: End of season
- Data includes all competitive competitions

==== Reserves/Academy ====
| No. | Pos. | Nationality | Player | Reserve Apps | Reserve Goals | Academy Apps | Academy Goals | Total Apps | Total Goals |
|---|---|---|---|---|---|---|---|---|---|
| 45 | MF | England | Marc Albrighton | 10 | 2 | 2 | 0 | 12 | 2 |
| 48 | DF | England | Nathan Baker | 4 | 0 | 12 | 0 | 16 | 0 |
| 46 | MF | Scotland | Barry Bannan | 11 | 3 | 4 | 0 | 15 | 3 |
| – | FW | England | Durrell Berry | 0 | 0 | 9 | 2 | 9 | 2 |
| – | MF | England | Richard Blythe | 1 | 0 | 16 | 1 | 17 | 1 |
| – | MF | England | Daniel Bradley | 0 | 0 | 6 | 1 | 6 | 1 |
| 47 | DF | England | Ciaran Clark | 12 | 1 | 9 | 1 | 21 | 2 |
| – | FW | England | James Collins | 10 | 1 | 22 | 24 | 32 | 25 |
| – | GK | Austria | Thomas Dau | 0 | 0 | 14 | 0 | 14 | 0 |
| 14 | FW | England | Nathan Delfouneso | 9 | 3 | 1 | 0 | 10 | 3 |
| * | GK | Northern Ireland | Conor Devlin | 0 | 0 | 1 | 0 | 1 | 0 |
| – | MF | England | Jack Dyer | 1 | 0 | 13 | 0 | 14 | 0 |
| – | DF | England | Calum Flanagan | 1 | 0 | 17 | 0 | 18 | 0 |
| 41 | MF | England | Harry Forrester | 3 | 0 | 18 | 5 | 21 | 5 |
| – | MF | England | Gary Gardner | 2 | 1 | 11 | 2 | 13 | 3 |
| – | MF | England | Will Grocott | 1 | 0 | 18 | 4 | 19 | 4 |
| – | DF | Netherlands | Arsenio Halfhuid | 0 | 0 | 5 | 0 | 5 | 0 |
| * | GK | Kosovo | Aldi Haxhia | 0 | 0 | 1 | 0 | 1 | 0 |
| 49 | MF | Australia | Chris Herd | 7 | 1 | 0 | 0 | 7 | 1 |
| 42 | MF | Austria | Dominik Hofbauer | 6 | 1 | 17 | 3 | 23 | 4 |
| – | MF | England | Jonathan Hogg | 5 | 3 | 0 | 0 | 5 | 3 |
| – | MF | England | Jason Lampkin | 0 | 0 | 8 | 0 | 8 | 0 |
| 43 | DF | United States | Eric Lichaj | 10 | 1 | 0 | 0 | 10 | 1 |
| – | MF | England | Ben Love | 0 | 0 | 5 | 0 | 5 | 0 |
| 51 | DF | Republic of Ireland | Shane Lowry | 8 | 1 | 0 | 0 | 8 | 1 |
| – | FW | Sweden | Tobias Mikaelsson | 3 | 0 | 0 | 0 | 3 | 0 |
| – | FW | England | Ethan Moore | 0 | 0 | 1 | 1 | 1 | 1 |
| 29 | DF | Republic of Ireland | Stephen O'Halloran | 2 | 0 | 0 | 0 | 2 | 0 |
| 53 | GK | England | Elliott Parish | 9 | 0 | 3 | 0 | 12 | 0 |
| – | FW | England | Kofi Poyser | 0 | 0 | 13 | 4 | 13 | 4 |
| – | DF | Wales | Tomos Roberts | 0 | 0 | 12 | 0 | 12 | 0 |
| – | DF | England | Matthew Roome | 5 | 0 | 14 | 0 | 19 | 0 |
| – | GK | Switzerland | Benjamin Siegrist | 0 | 0 | 4 | 0 | 4 | 0 |
| – | MF | England | Ryan Simmonds | 0 | 0 | 13 | 0 | 13 | 0 |
| – | DF | England | Sam Simmonds | 1 | 0 | 6 | 0 | 7 | 0 |
| – | MF | Hungary | András Stieber | 0 | 0 | 11 | 4 | 11 | 4 |
| * | MF | Hungary | Zoltán Stieber | 8 | 2 | 0 | 0 | 8 | 2 |
| – | FW | Austria | Andreas Weimann | 10 | 2 | 18 | 6 | 28 | 8 |
| – | DF | Republic of Ireland | Derrick Williams | 0 | 0 | 1 | 0 | 1 | 0 |
| – | FW | England | Sam Williams | 4 | 0 | 0 | 0 | 4 | 0 |

- Last Update: 25 March 2009
- Data includes all competitions
- Zoltán Stieber signed for TuS Koblenz on 29 January 2009. Conor Devlin and Aldi Haxhia were signed on emergency short-term loan deals. Both returned to Manchester United and Chelsea respectively.

=== Squad information ===
| N | Pos. | Nat. | Name | Age | EU | Since | App(GS/Sub) | Goals | Ends | Transfer fee | Notes |
|---|---|---|---|---|---|---|---|---|---|---|---|
| 1 | GK | (United States) | Brad Friedel | 37 | Non-EU | 2008 | 16 (16/0) | 0 | 2011 | £2.5m | |
| 13 | GK | (England) | Stuart Taylor | 27 | EU | 2005 | 17 (14/3) | 0 | 2009 | Undisclosed | |
| 22 | GK | (United States) | Brad Guzan | 23 | Non-EU | 2008 | 2 (2/0) | 0 | 2011 | £0.6m | |
| 2 | RB | (England) | Luke Young | 29 | EU | 2008 | 14 (13/1) | 1 | 2011 | £6m | |
| 3 | LB | (Netherlands) | Wilfred Bouma | 30 | EU | 2005 | 90 (87/3) | 1 | 2011 | £3.5m | |
| 5 | CB | (Denmark) | Martin Laursen | 31 | EU | 2004 | 83 (81/2) | 11 | 2010 | £3m | |
| 15 | CB | (England) | Curtis Davies | 23 | EU | 2008 | 27 (22/5) | 1 | 2012 | Undisclosed | |
| 16 | CB | (England) | Zat Knight | 28 | EU | 2007 | 34 (32/2) | 1 | 2011 | £3.5m | |
| 21 | LB | (England) | Nicky Shorey | 27 | EU | 2008 | 16 (16/0) | 0 | 2011 | Undisclosed | |
| 24 | CB | (Spain) | Carlos Cuéllar | 27 | EU | 2008 | 12 (9/3) | 0 | 2012 | £7.8m | |
| 29 | LB | (Republic of Ireland) | Stephen O'Halloran | 20 | EU | 2008 | 0 (0/0) | 0 | 2009 | Academy | |
| 4 | CM | (England) | Steve Sidwell | 25 | EU | 2008 | 6 (3/3) | 1 | 2011 | Undisclosed | |
| 6 | CM | (England) | Gareth Barry | 27 | EU | 1997 | 410 (393/17) | 49 | 2010 | Undisclosed | |
| 7 | LM | (England) | Ashley Young | 23 | EU | 2007 | 70 (67/3) | 14 | 2011 | £9.6m | |
| 8 | RM | (England) | James Milner | 22 | EU | 2008 | 45 (40/5) | 3 | 2012 | £12m | |
| 17 | CM | (Togo) | Moustapha Salifou | 25 | Non-EU | 2007 | 9 (3/6) | 0 | 2009 | Undisclosed | |
| 19 | CM | (Bulgaria) | Stiliyan Petrov | 29 | EU | 2006 | 82 (75/7) | 4 | 2010 | £6.5m | |
| 20 | CM | (England) | Nigel Reo-Coker | 24 | EU | 2007 | 56 (56/0) | 3 | 2011 | £8.5m | |
| 26 | CM | (England) | Craig Gardner | 21 | EU | 2005 | 58 (37/21) | 6 | 2011 | Academy | |
| 27 | CM | (England) | Isaiah Osbourne | 20 | EU | 2006 | 26 (13/13) | 0 | 2011 | Academy | |
| 9 | CF | (England) | Marlon Harewood | 29 | EU | 2006 | 34 (7/27) | 7 | 2010 | £4m | |
| 10 | CF | (Norway) | John Carew | 28 | EU | 2007 | 59 (57/2) | 23 | 2010 | Part-Exchange | |
| 11 | CF | (England) | Gabriel Agbonlahor | 21 | EU | 2006 | 110 (102/8) | 29 | 2011 | Academy | |
| 14 | CF | (England) | Nathan Delfouneso | 17 | EU | 2008 | 3 (0/3) | 0 | 2010 | Academy | |
| 18 | CF | (England) | Emile Heskey | 29 | EU | 2009 | 3 (3/0) | 1 | 2012 | £3.5m | |

- Last updated: 12 May 2008
- Source: avfc.co.uk, players' Wikipedia articles
- Ordered by position on pitch (from back right to front left).
