= Martin Laursen =

Danish footballer (born 1977)

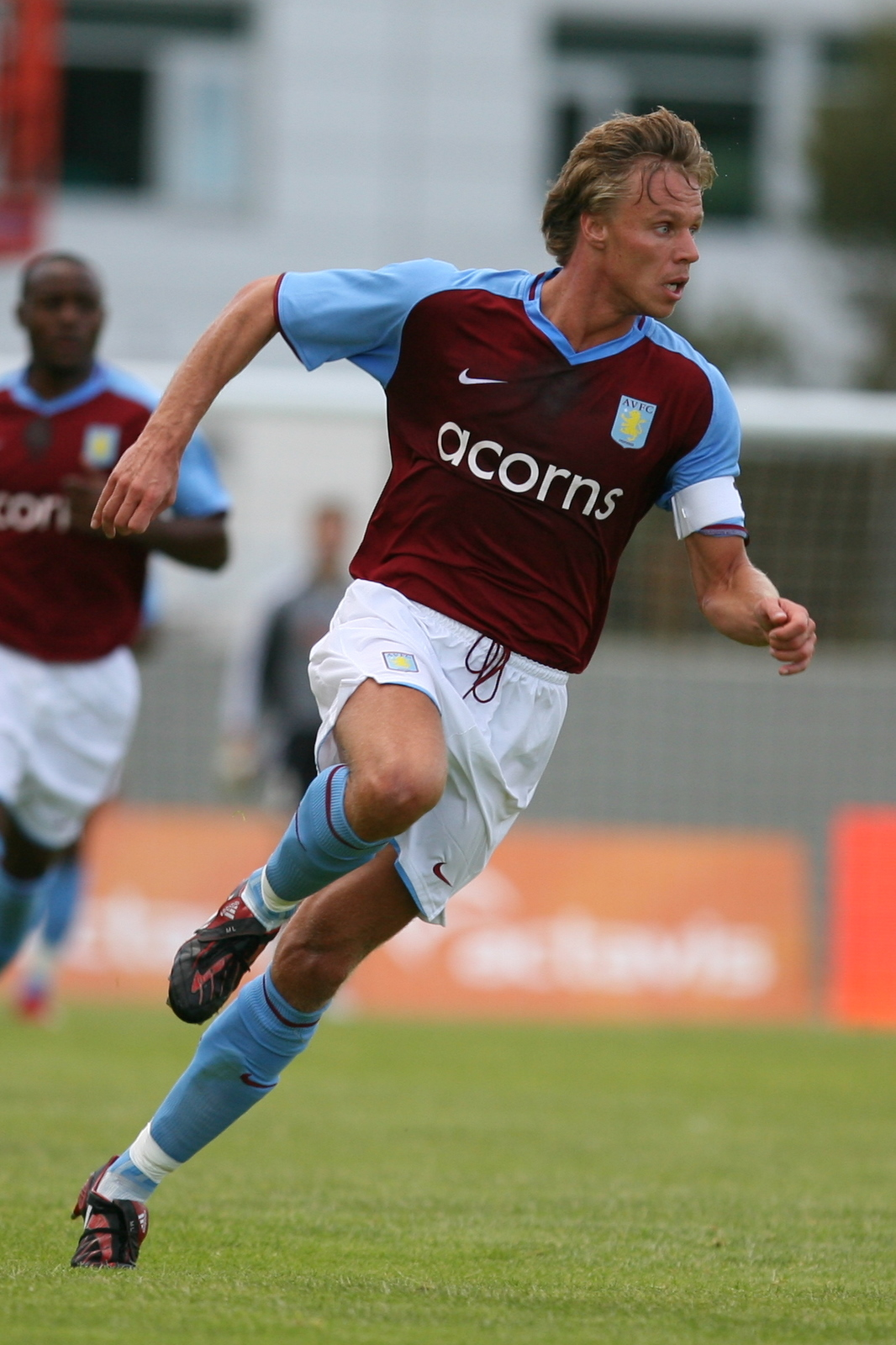
- Laursen playing for Aston Villa, sporting the team captain's armband

Personal information
- Full name: Martin Laursen
- Date of birth: 26 July 1977 (age 49)
- Place of birth: Fårvang, Denmark
- Height: 1.90 m (6 ft 3 in)
- Position: Centre-back

Youth career
- Horn/Fårvang

Senior career*
| Years | Team | Apps | (Gls) |
| 1995–1998 | Silkeborg | 35 | (1) |
| 1998–2001 | Hellas Verona | 58 | (3) |
| 2001–2002 | Parma | 0 | (0) |
| 2001–2002 | → Milan (loan) | 22 | (2) |
| 2002–2004 | Milan | 20 | (0) |
| 2004–2009 | Aston Villa | 84 | (8) |
| Total | | 219 | (14) |

International career
| 1996 | Denmark U-19 | 1 | (0) |
| 1997–1999 | Denmark U-21 | 14 | (0) |
| 2000–2008 | Denmark | 53 | (2) |

Managerial career
- 2011–2012: Søllerød-Vedbæk
- * Club domestic league appearances and goals

Martin Laursen (Danish pronunciation: [ˈmɑːtsʰn̩ ˈlæwˀsn̩]; born 26 July 1977) is a Danish former professional footballer who played in the centre-back position. He played three seasons for Italian club A.C. Milan, with whom he won the 2003 UEFA Champions League and the 2004 Serie A championship. He also played for Italian clubs Hellas Verona and Parma, and was the team captain of English club Aston Villa. He was most recently the manager of Søllerød-Vedbæk.

Laursen was capped 53 times and scored two goals for the Denmark national team from 2000 to 2008, and he was named 2008 Danish Football Player of the Year. He represented Denmark at the 2000 European Championship, 2002 FIFA World Cup, and 2004 European Championship tournaments.

== Club career ==
=== Youth career and Silkeborg ===
Born in Fårvang near Silkeborg, Laursen started playing football with local amateur club Horn/Fårvang. He started his senior career with nearby top-flight club Silkeborg in the Danish Superliga championship. Laursen made his Silkeborg debut in October 1995, under Silkeborg manager Preben Elkjær. Laursen helped steer Silkeborg to second place in the 1997–98 Superliga season, under new Silkeborg manager Sepp Piontek, as he played 22 games and scored one goal during that season. Laursen played 35 games and scored one goal for Silkeborg in the Superliga from his debut until his last game in June 1998.

=== Verona ===
After three seasons at Silkeborg, Laursen moved to Italy in August 1998, to play for Hellas Verona in the second-tier Serie B league. The contact with Verona was mediated by former Verona player and Silkeborg manager Preben Elkjær. Laursen was plagued by a knee injury for the majority of his first season at Verona, where the club won promotion to the top-flight Serie A championship. Laursen established himself in the Verona starting lineup during his second season in Italy. He became known as Lionheart Laursen among the Verona fans, describing his courage and great ability to time his headers.

Seeking a high-profile move, Parma made a successful bid of 9,000 million Italian lire (€4,648,112) to sign half of the registration rights of Laursen in June 2000, in a deal including Parma-owned player Anthony Šerić remaining at Verona on loan. Laursen played a further season with Verona. After the 2000–01 Serie A season, Laursen moved to join Parma who acquired the remaining 50% of his registration rights for another 9,000 million Italian lire (€4,648,112), while Šerić in turn made a co-ownership deal with Verona in June 2001, for 2,500 million lire (€1,291,142). Following only three weeks of training at the club, Parma loaned Laursen out before he would play any games for the club.

=== A.C. Milan ===
In July 2001, Laursen was loaned out to Serie A rivals A.C. Milan, who needed depth in their squad. He started out strong for his new club, scoring two goals in the first four rounds of the 2001–02 Serie A season, and played 22 league games in his first season with Milan. Milan decided to buy him in the middle of the season for a fee of 21.5 billion lire (€11,103,823). In the summer 2002, Milan bought Italian international defender Alessandro Nesta, and Laursen's playing time diminished to a combined 20 league games in the next two seasons.

Though winning silverware with Milan in 2003, Laursen did not play in the UEFA Champions League final. He won the Coppa Italia, UEFA Champions League and European Super Cup in 2003, and the 2004 Serie A championship. Due to the presence of Paolo Maldini and Alessandro Nesta, Laursen failed to establish himself in Milan's first team in the long run. When Milan bought Dutch international defender Jaap Stam in May 2004, Laursen left the club shortly thereafter.

=== Aston Villa ===
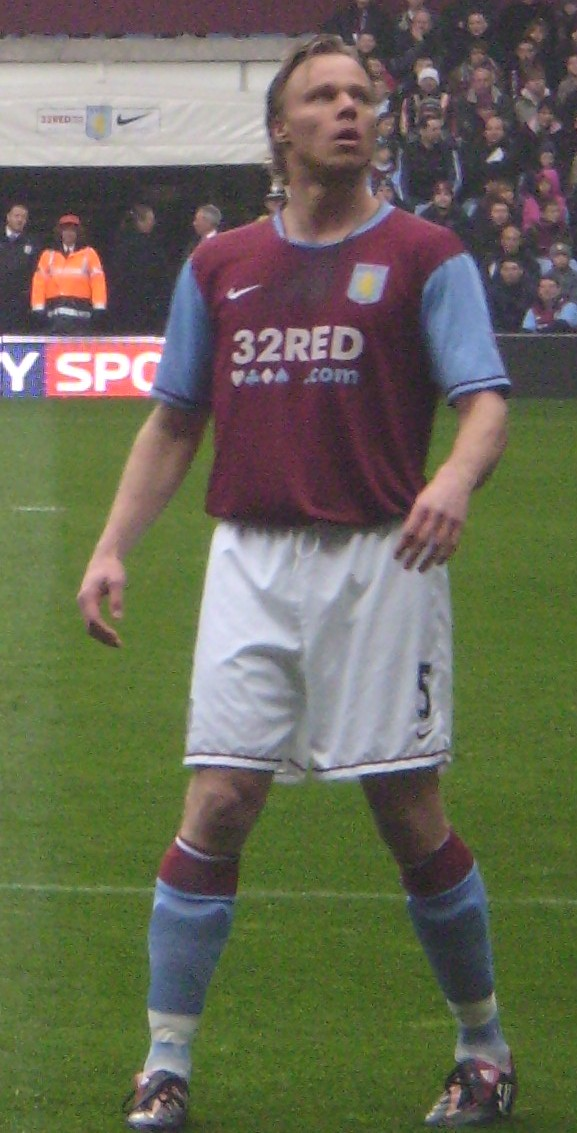
Laursen during a Premier League match against Birmingham City on 20 April 2008.

On 21 May 2004, Laursen was bought by FA Premier League side Aston Villa for a fee of £3 million, on a four-year contract. His debut with Villa came against Southampton on 14 August, a match which ended 2–0 in Villa's favour. Laursen's time at Villa initially proved frustrating. He put in a few encouraging performances on and off, during the 2004–05 season, but the knee injury that plagued him earlier in his career returned and kept Laursen at playing only one Premier League game for Aston Villa during the 2005–06 season. After a re-occurrence of the knee injury during the summer 2006 off-season, his playing future at club and international level was seen to be in doubt. He underwent a full rehabilitation in Bologna, and returned to the Villa side in August 2006. Villa hired Martin O'Neill as manager in August 2006, and he and Laursen came to an understanding of giving Laursen the freedom to train as he wanted, which helped prevent further injuries. Laursen became an integral part of O'Neill's plans, and the physical English playing style proved to suit Laursen perfectly. Laursen became an effective goalscorer for Villa during the 2007–08 season, scoring six goals from his position of centre-back. This included three goals against Tottenham Hotspur, two of which came in a thrilling 4–4 draw at White Hart Lane, the other coming in a 2–1 home victory. Laursen agreed terms on a new two-and-a-half-year deal with Aston Villa in January 2008. He played all Villa's matches, except for League Cup games, during the 2007–08 season and he was voted the Supporters' Player of the Year in 2008.

Laursen replaced Gareth Barry as club captain for Villa on a permanent basis for the 2008–09 season. In Aston Villa's first game of the 2008–09 season, Laursen captained the side in the UEFA Intertoto Cup, and continued his goal-scoring record from set pieces by scoring Villa's second goal in the 2–2 draw against Danish team Odense. Laursen also managed to get onto the scoresheet in a UEFA Cup match with Hafnarfjörður, and against Stoke City in the Premiership. On 23 October 2008, Laursen gave Aston Villa the lead in the UEFA Cup game against Ajax with a header from close-range. Villa went on to win the match 2–1. He was named 2008 Danish Football Player of the Year in November 2008.

In December 2008, Laursen was injured again. He returned for the game against West Bromwich Albion in January 2009, but suffered an injury relapse. In April 2009, O'Neill expressed his fears that Laursen's career might be over due to the injuries which, even if treated, would require ten months of reconvalescence. In May 2009, Laursen announced his decision to retire from football rather than undergo major surgery. 24 May saw Aston Villa's final game of the season at home to Newcastle United. Prior to kick-off, Laursen appeared in front of the Villa Park crowd and gave a speech where he thanked the fans and wish them well for the future. Following this, he was inducted into the "Villa Legends" section of Aston Villa's official website.

== International career ==
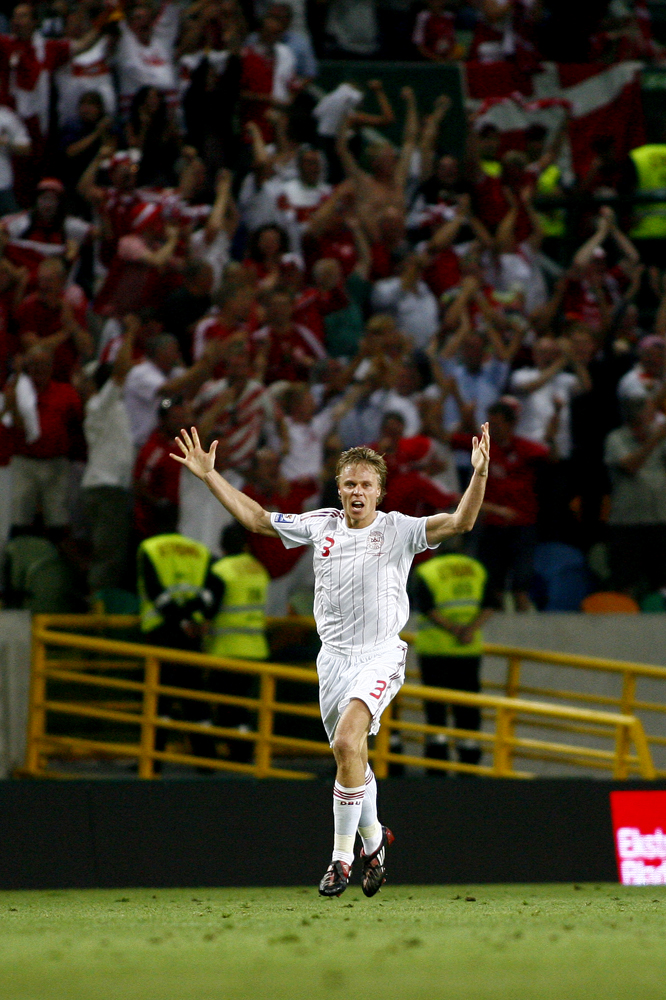
Laursen during the 3–2 win against Portugal on 10 September 2008; a qualification game for the 2010 World Cup.

While playing for Silkeborg, Laursen played one game for the Denmark under-19 national team in December 1996. He was called up for the Denmark under-21 national team in February 1997, and went on to play 14 games for the under-21s until June 1999. Laursen made his debut for the senior Denmark national team in a friendly match against Portugal in March 2000. He was a part of the Denmark squad at the UEFA Euro 2000, though he did not play a single game at the tournament due to injury.

Laursen's breakthrough with the national team came at the 2002 FIFA World Cup, when he played full-time in all four Denmark games before elimination. Laursen scored his first goal for his country in September 2003, in the UEFA Euro 2004 qualification, an all-important goal in injury time of the penultimate qualification match. His goal levelled the game with Romania to 2–2, and kept Denmark in the race for a place at the final competition. Laursen and the Denmark team secured qualification when they drew the last game, thus winning their qualification group. Laursen played full-time in Denmark's four games at the tournament, playing impressively.

After the March 2005 game against Kazakhstan, Laursen's national team career went on a hiatus, due to a knee injury. After his absence from the Danish national team for more than one and a half years, he was called up in November 2006, but had to withdraw from the team before the game due to yet another knee injury. In June 2007, Laursen returned to Denmark's starting line-up in a 2–0 win against Latvia. He played his last international game on 11 October 2008 against Malta. In January 2009, Laursen announced his retirement from international football, as he found it physically straining to play for both club and country.

== Retirement ==
Laursen returned to Denmark following his retirement, settling in Vedbæk. He worked as a football pundit for Sky Sports briefly, and also as a co-commentator for Danish broadcaster TV2. The former defender told the website of previous club Aston Villa that his primary focus was to spend time with his family; a career in the football media allows him to remain active in the game whilst not taking up too much time. However, he refused to rule out a career in coaching or management in the future.

Spending time with my family. That was important to me. It might not be enough in 10 years time though. Then I may want to be a manager – or something else – but as it is now it would be hard for me to be a football boss and go into training and have football on my mind 24 hours per day.

I am not ready for that yet. But you never know, in the future things might change. At the moment this is perfect for me.

— Martin Laursen

== Managerial career ==
In September 2011, Martin Laursen took the job as head coach of Søllerød-Vedbæk in the Danish 2nd Divisions in order to start a managing career. He resigned on 14 June 2012 after steering the club clear of relegation.

== Career statistics ==
=== International goals ===
Scores and results list Denmark's goal tally first, score column indicates score after each Laursen goal.

List of international goals scored by Martin Laursen
| No. | Date | Venue | Opponent | Score | Result | Competition |
|---|---|---|---|---|---|---|
| 1 | 10 September 2003 | Copenhagen, Denmark | Romania | 2–2 | 2–2 | UEFA Euro 2004 qualification |
| 2 | 12 September 2007 | Aarhus, Denmark | Liechtenstein | 2–0 | 4–0 | UEFA Euro 2008 qualification |

== Honours ==
Milan

- Serie A: 2003–04
- Coppa Italia: 2002–03
- UEFA Champions League: 2002–03
- UEFA Super Cup: 2003

Individual

- Danish Football Player of the Year: 2008
- Aston Villa Supporters' Player of the Year: 2008
