= Sam Williams (footballer) =

English footballer (born 1987)

Personal information
- Full name: Samuel Williams
- Date of birth: 9 June 1987 (age 39)
- Place of birth: Greenwich, England
- Position: Striker

Youth career
- Charlton Athletic
- 2005–2006: Aston Villa

Senior career*
Years	Team	Apps	(Gls)
2006–2009	Aston Villa	0	(0)
2006	→ Wrexham (loan)	15	(2)
2006	→ Brighton & Hove Albion (loan)	3	(1)
2008	→ Colchester United (loan)	1	(0)
2009	→ Walsall (loan)	5	(1)
2009	→ Brentford (loan)	11	(2)
2009–2011	Yeovil Town	70	(6)
2011–2013	Dagenham & Redbridge	43	(10)
Total		148	(22)
- * Club domestic league appearances and goals

Sam Williams (born 9 June 1987) is an English former footballer.

== Career ==
Naturally a defensive midfielder before the start of the 2005–06 season, Williams took straight into the role of an attacker, after injuries to strikers. Although never having started a first team game for Aston Villa, Williams was a regular scorer for the clubs reserves.

Williams was sent on loan multiple times to gain first team experience, his first loan spell being at Wrexham where he scored on his debut against Wycombe Wanderers.

In November 2008, Williams spent a month on loan at League One side Colchester United, again scoring on his debut in a 1–0 victory over AFC Bournemouth.

In January 2009 he joined Walsall on another single month loan deal. He returned to Villa on 26 February due to a hip injury, although Saddlers boss Chris Hutchings refused to rule out Williams returning to the Bescot Stadium again.

Williams then joined Brentford on an initial one-month loan with a view to extend the deal. He came on as a substitute on his début against Barnet and missed a sitter, however 4 days later he came on again as a substitute and scored the goal in front on 10,672 fans which saw Brentford snatch a point in the 3–3 draw with Wycombe Wanderers. The loan was extended until the 2008–09 season on 25 March.

He joined Yeovil Town on 21 July 2009 on a two-year deal after impressing whilst on trial at the club. His first goal for the club was on 12 September in a 2 – 2 draw with Stockport.

He was informed by the club at the end of the season that he would not be awarded a new deal.
Williams joined Charlton Athletic on trial in July 2011 and scored in his uncompetitive debut against Welling United on 9 July 2011. In August 2011 Williams signed for Dagenham & Redbridge. On 7 May 2013, he was released by the Daggers due to the expiry of his contract.

== Career statistics ==
As of 26 February 2013.

Appearances and goals by club, season and competition
Club	Season	League			FA Cup		League Cup		Other{		Total	
Club	Season	Division	Apps	Goals	Apps	Goals	Apps	Goals	Apps	Goals	Apps	Goals
Aston Villa	2005–06	Premier League	0	0	0	0	0	0	—		0	0
Aston Villa	2006–07	Premier League	0	0	0	0	0	0	—		0	0
Aston Villa	2007–08	Premier League	0	0	0	0	0	0	—		0	0
Aston Villa	2008–09	Premier League	0	0	0	0	0	0	0	0	0	0
Aston Villa	Total		0	0	0	0	0	0	0	0	0	0
Wrexham (loan)	2005–06	League Two	15	2	0	0	0	0	0	0	15	2
Brighton & Hove Albion (loan)	2006–07	League One	3	1	0	0	0	0	1 (Note: Appearances in Football League Trophy)	0	4	1
Colchester United (loan)	2008–09	League One	1	0	1	0	0	0	1	1	3	1
Walsall (loan)	2008–09	League One	5	1	0	0	0	0	0	0	5	1
Brentford (loan)	2008–09	League Two	11	2	0	0	0	0	0	0	11	2
Yeovil Town	2009–10	League One	34	4	1	0	1	0	1	0	37	4
Yeovil Town	2011–12	League One	36	2	2	0	1	0	1	0	40	2
Yeovil Town	Total		70	6	3	0	2	0	2	0	77	6
Dagenham & Redbridge	2011–12	League Two	10	2	0	0	1	0	1	1	12	3
Dagenham & Redbridge	2012–13	League Two	33	8	1	0	1	0	1	0	36	8
Dagenham & Redbridge	Total		43	10	1	0	2	0	2	1	48	11
Career totals			148	22	5	0	4	0	6	2	163	24
