= Stuart Taylor (footballer, born 1980) =

English footballer (born 1980)

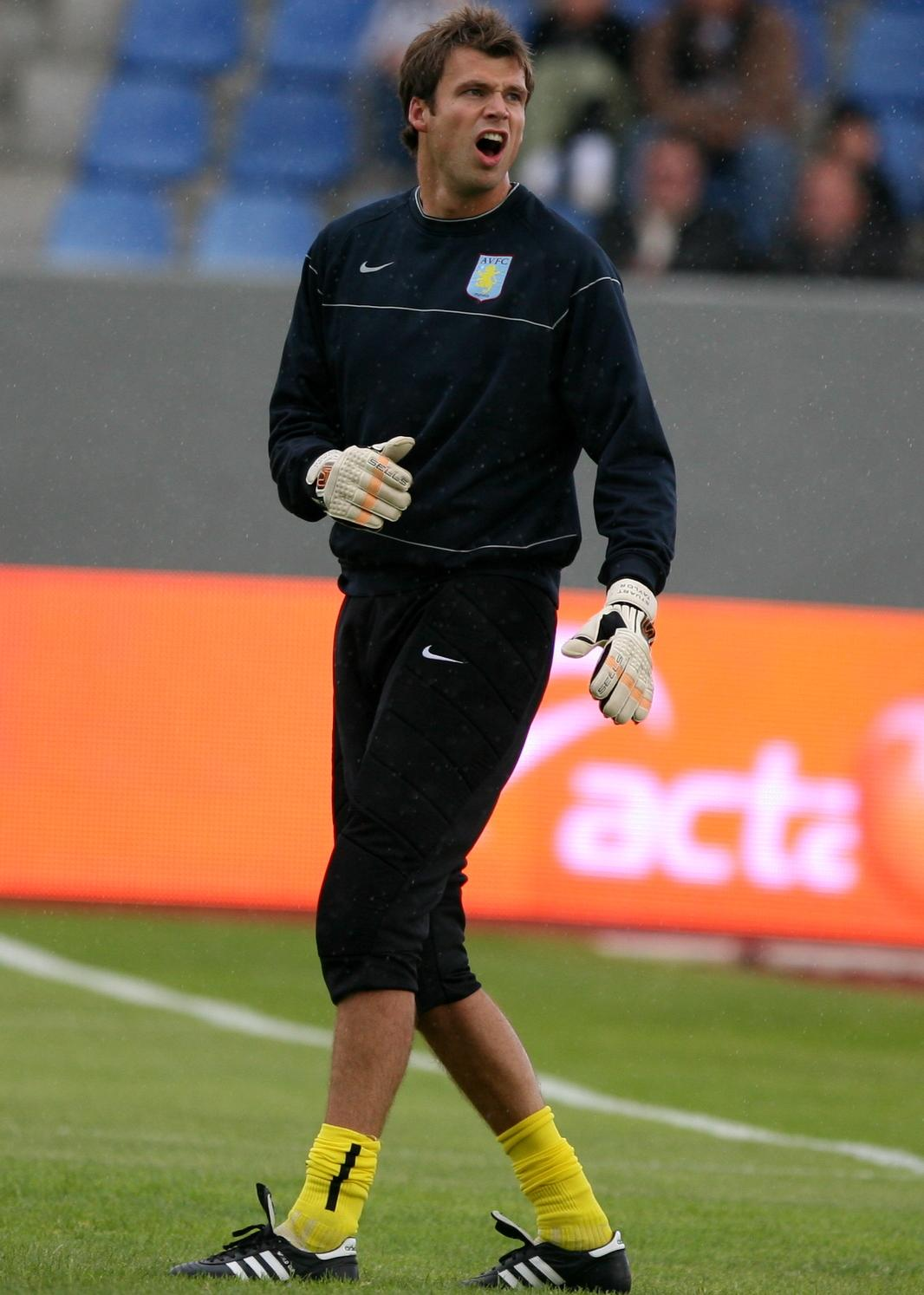
- Taylor warming up for Aston Villa in 2008

Personal information
- Full name: Stuart James Taylor
- Date of birth: 28 November 1980 (age 45)
- Place of birth: Romford, England
- Height: 6 ft 6 in (1.98 m)
- Position: Goalkeeper

Youth career
- Wimbledon
- Arsenal

Senior career*
| Years | Team | Apps | (Gls) |
| 1997–2005 | Arsenal | 18 | (0) |
| 1999 | → Bristol Rovers (loan) | 4 | (0) |
| 2000 | → Crystal Palace (loan) | 10 | (0) |
| 2001 | → Peterborough United (loan) | 6 | (0) |
| 2004–2005 | → Leicester City (loan) | 10 | (0) |
| 2005–2009 | Aston Villa | 12 | (0) |
| 2009 | → Cardiff City (loan) | 8 | (0) |
| 2009–2012 | Manchester City | 0 | (0) |
| 2012–2014 | Reading | 4 | (0) |
| 2013 | → Yeovil Town (loan) | 0 | (0) |
| 2014–2015 | Leeds United | 3 | (0) |
| 2016–2018 | Southampton | 0 | (0) |
| Total | | 75 | (0) |

International career
| 1997 | England U16 | 1 | (0) |
| 1998–1999 | England U18 | 5 | (0) |
| 1999 | England U20 | 2 | (0) |
| 2001 | England U21 | 3 | (0) |
- * Club domestic league appearances and goals

Stuart James Taylor (born 28 November 1980) is an English former professional footballer who played as a goalkeeper.

Taylor began his career with Arsenal, winning the 2001–02 Premier League and 2002–03 FA Cup and representing England at under-16, under-18, under-20 and under-21 level. He was spoken of as a future replacement for Arsenal and England goalkeeper David Seaman but after other goalkeepers were signed, he struggled to get playing time after 2003 and he joined Aston Villa in 2005.

Initially second-choice behind Thomas Sørensen, Taylor was again supplanted by other keepers and pushed down the pecking order. He left Aston Villa in 2009, having played only 12 league matches in four seasons. He then joined Manchester City, before spells at Reading, Leeds United and Southampton. Taylor spent most of his career as a third-choice goalkeeper, only making 95 career appearances. He currently runs his own goalkeeping academy.

== Club career ==
=== Arsenal ===
Taylor was born in Romford, London. After a brief spell as a teenager with Wimbledon, Taylor joined Arsenal in 1997 as a youth player. He made his Arsenal debut in a League Cup game against Ipswich Town in November 2000. While at Arsenal he was loaned out to Bristol Rovers, Crystal Palace, Peterborough United and Leicester City. His league debut for Arsenal came in a 3–1 win against Manchester United in November 2001. He went on to make ten League appearances in Arsenal's 2001–02 Premier League-winning season, thus qualifying him for a winners' medal. This feat was achieved in the final match against Everton, with the title already won. Richard Wright started the game with Taylor upon nine appearances. Manager Arsène Wenger substituted Wright in the 85th minute of play for Taylor who thus earned a medal with this cap.

During his time at Arsenal he was tipped to become David Seaman's successor. However, although he saw off competition from Alex Manninger and Wright, the signings of Jens Lehmann and Manuel Almunia in 2003 and 2004 respectively saw him struggle for playing time. Taylor also missed the whole of the 2003–04 season due to a persistent shoulder problem. After the signing of Almunia, Taylor thus became the club's third-choice goalkeeper and Wenger told Taylor that he would understand if he chose to leave. During his stay at Highbury Taylor won a league title, an FA Cup as well as two Charity Shields. Altogether he made 30 appearances in all competitions for Arsenal.

=== Aston Villa ===
In June 2005 Taylor moved to Aston Villa, signing on a four-year deal. He became Villa's second-choice goalkeeper, behind Thomas Sørensen. Taylor recalls being told that he would play if Sørensen was injured or in poor form, but those chances "never materialised. I kept being told I would play this game or that game, and I never did. You get your hopes up, and it's hard to take. Football is a cruel game. People tell you what they think you want to hear." During the 2005–06 season he made just two appearances for the club. He saved Wayne Rooney's penalty in a match against Manchester United on 20 October 2007 during a match in which first-choice goalkeeper Scott Carson was sent off. When Sørensen left, Villa signed Brad Friedel and Brad Guzan at the start of the 2008–09 season. Friedel became the first choice goalkeeper with Guzan second choice and Taylor slipping down to third. This despite generally putting in good performances, when called upon. Taylor's final appearance for Villa was the game against Odense BK in the 2008 UEFA Intertoto Cup.

=== Cardiff City (loan) ===
In a bid to find first team football, Taylor began to search for a short-term loan deal at a Football League side, entering into talks with League One club Leeds United. However, on 13 March 2009, a last minute offer from Cardiff City prompted Taylor to instead opt for the Championship side on a one-month loan deal, becoming the third goalkeeper to sign on loan at the club during the season, after Tom Heaton and Dimitrios Konstantopoulos. He made his debut for the side two days later in a 1–1 draw with Bristol City.

Taylor continued as first choice for Cardiff throughout his first month at the club, despite the return of Tom Heaton from injury, and his loan deal was extended to the end of the season. However, following a 6–0 defeat to Preston North End, Taylor was dropped from the side for the final three games of the season. At the end of the campaign, he returned to Villa Park.

=== Manchester City ===
Taylor signed for Manchester City on a free transfer on 23 June 2009, following the expiration of his contract at Villa. He officially became a Manchester City player on 1 July 2009. Taylor admitted taking advice from Brad Friedel, who had previously worked with manager Mark Hughes and goalkeeping coach Kevin Hitchcock at Blackburn Rovers. On 18 July 2009, when Manchester City played the South African team Orlando Pirates, Taylor conceded his first two goals for the club. Signed as cover for Shay Given, Taylor was promised playing time in the FA Cup and League Cup, but this also failed to materialise. Taylor made his only first-team appearance for the club in an FA Cup 4th round tie against Scunthorpe United on 24 January 2010, which City won 4–2.

On 10 July, he signed a new two-year deal with the club, despite being officially released by City nine days earlier. Taylor also played against New York Red Bulls on 25 July 2010 in the second half in City's U.S. Tour, and conceded one goal in a 2–1 defeat. After the return of Joe Hart from a loan spell, Taylor once again found himself third-choice goalkeeper. He fell further down the pecking order, with Costel Pantilimon starting in front of him in a League Cup tie against former club Arsenal on 29 November 2011, which City won 1–0. After winning the 2011–12 Premier League title as Manchester City's third choice goalkeeper, he was released by City for a second time on 1 June 2012, alongside other goalkeeper Gunnar Nielsen.

=== Reading ===
Reading announced on 13 July 2012 that Taylor was training with them and would play a part in their first team friendly with AFC Wimbledon the next day. On 20 August 2012, Reading manager Brian McDermott announced that they had signed Taylor on a one-year contract. Injuries to both Adam Federici and Alex McCarthy saw Taylor make his Reading debut on 2 March in a 3–1 defeat to Everton in the Premier League. Taylor played against his former club Arsenal on 30 March 2013 in a 4–1 loss at the Emirates Stadium. Taylor signed a new one-year deal with Reading, keeping him at the club till June 2014, on 2 August 2013.

On 18 November 2013, Taylor joined fellow Championship side Yeovil Town on an initial one-month loan deal. Taylor's loan with Yeovil was cut short without making a competitive appearance after just two days due to "personal reasons".

Taylor's spell at Reading found him as a backup goalkeeper to regular goalkeepers McCarthy and Federici. He left the club at the end of the 2013–14 season upon the expiry of his contract.

=== Leeds United ===
Taylor signed a one-year contract with Leeds United on 3 July 2014. Taylor revealed that he was hoping to challenge for the number 1 spot, after revealing that Leeds were also looking to sign another goalkeeper. On 8 July, Leeds signed a new number 1 goalkeeper in Marco Silvestri from Chievo Verona. On 1 August, Taylor was assigned the Leeds number 13 shirt for the 2014–15 season.

Taylor made his Leeds United debut on 12 August 2014, starting the League Cup match against Accrington Stanley. Taylor started for Leeds on 27 August in the 2–1 defeat against Bradford City in the League Cup.

Taylor made his league debut in the game against Charlton Athletic on 18 April 2015 in a 2–1 loss, with Taylor giving away a penalty.

On 13 May 2015, upon the expiry of his contract, Leeds announced that they would not be renewing Taylor's contract at the club. Taylor, who had played only 9 games between 2012 and 2015, considered retirement: "You go round thinking things will happen, that surely you will get games, and it becomes very demoralising. I was fed up." He turned down the chance to join clubs in League One and League Two as he felt that even if he played more matches, it would be an admission that he was not good enough to play in the Premier League: "People will say I am wrong, but I wanted to play at the highest level I thought I could play at. I felt I was good enough to be in the Premier League."

=== Southampton ===
On 26 August 2016, after a year without a club, Taylor joined Southampton on a one-year contract. Taylor joined knowing he would be third-choice behind Fraser Forster and Alex McCarthy: "nobody promised me anything. I know my role." On 13 July 2017, Southampton announced that Taylor's contract had been extended for another year. On 30 June 2018, Taylor left Southampton after his contract expired, without having made a first-team appearance.

In an interview with the New York Times in December 2017, Taylor talked about his career and the frustrations he had at barely playing and becoming known for being a third-choice keeper: "There is definitely a perception of me... [as a man who] loves going round clubs, earning money for doing nothing." He dismissed suggestions that he "sits around doing nothing, turning up for training, having a jolly, messing about" and had become wealthy after spending so long in the Premier League, saying that when his playing career ends "I will have to work. People assume I have made serious money. I really haven't." He said that "every coach I have had, every goalkeeper I have worked with, has said I should have played 200 or 300 Premier League games. I look back at it and think the same."

== International career ==
Taylor played for the England U20 team at the 1999 FIFA World Youth Championship alongside Ashley Cole, Peter Crouch and Andrew Johnson. He was capped three times for the England U21 team.

== Career statistics ==
Appearances and goals by club, season and competition
| Club | Season | League | | | FA Cup | | League Cup | | Europe | | Other | | Total | |
| Club | Season | Division | Apps | Goals | Apps | Goals | Apps | Goals | Apps | Goals | Apps | Goals | Apps | Goals |
|---|---|---|---|---|---|---|---|---|---|---|---|---|---|---|
| Arsenal | 1999–2000 | Premier League | 0 | 0 | 0 | 0 | 0 | 0 | 0 | 0 | 0 | 0 | 0 | 0 |
| Arsenal | 2000–01 | Premier League | 0 | 0 | 0 | 0 | 1 | 0 | 1 (Note: Appearances in UEFA Champions League) | 0 | — | | 2 | 0 |
| Arsenal | 2001–02 | Premier League | 10 | 0 | 1 | 0 | 2 | 0 | 2 | 0 | — | | 15 | 0 |
| Arsenal | 2002–03 | Premier League | 8 | 0 | 2 | 0 | 1 | 0 | 2 | 0 | 0 | 0 | 13 | 0 |
| Arsenal | 2003–04 | Premier League | 0 | 0 | 0 | 0 | 0 | 0 | 0 | 0 | 0 | 0 | 0 | 0 |
| Arsenal | 2004–05 | Premier League | 0 | 0 | 0 | 0 | 0 | 0 | 0 | 0 | 0 | 0 | 0 | 0 |
| Arsenal | Total | | 18 | 0 | 3 | 0 | 4 | 0 | 5 | 0 | 0 | 0 | 30 | 0 |
| Bristol Rovers (loan) | 1999–2000 | Second Division | 4 | 0 | — | | — | | — | | — | | 4 | 0 |
| Crystal Palace (loan) | 2000–01 | First Division | 10 | 0 | — | | — | | — | | — | | 10 | 0 |
| Peterborough United (loan) | 2000–01 | Second Division | 6 | 0 | — | | — | | — | | — | | 6 | 0 |
| Leicester City (loan) | 2004–05 | Championship | 10 | 0 | — | | — | | — | | — | | 10 | 0 |
| Aston Villa | 2005–06 | Premier League | 2 | 0 | 0 | 0 | 0 | 0 | — | | — | | 2 | 0 |
| Aston Villa | 2006–07 | Premier League | 6 | 0 | 0 | 0 | 1 | 0 | — | | — | | 7 | 0 |
| Aston Villa | 2007–08 | Premier League | 4 | 0 | 0 | 0 | 2 | 0 | — | | — | | 6 | 0 |
| Aston Villa | 2008–09 | Premier League | 0 | 0 | 0 | 0 | 0 | 0 | 2 (Note: Appearances in 2008 UEFA Intertoto Cup) | 0 | — | | 2 | 0 |
| Aston Villa | Total | | 12 | 0 | 0 | 0 | 3 | 0 | 2 | 0 | — | | 17 | 0 |
| Cardiff City (loan) | 2008–09 | Championship | 8 | 0 | 0 | 0 | 0 | 0 | — | | — | | 8 | 0 |
| Manchester City | 2009–10 | Premier League | 0 | 0 | 1 | 0 | 0 | 0 | — | | — | | 1 | 0 |
| Manchester City | 2010–11 | Premier League | 0 | 0 | 0 | 0 | 0 | 0 | 0 | 0 | — | | 0 | 0 |
| Manchester City | 2011–12 | Premier League | 0 | 0 | 0 | 0 | 0 | 0 | 0 | 0 | 0 | 0 | 0 | 0 |
| Manchester City | Total | | 0 | 0 | 1 | 0 | 0 | 0 | 0 | 0 | 0 | 0 | 1 | 0 |
| Reading | 2012–13 | Premier League | 4 | 0 | 0 | 0 | 0 | 0 | — | | — | | 4 | 0 |
| Reading | 2013–14 | Championship | 0 | 0 | 0 | 0 | 0 | 0 | — | | — | | 0 | 0 |
| Reading | Total | | 4 | 0 | 0 | 0 | 0 | 0 | — | | — | | 4 | 0 |
| Leeds United | 2014–15 | Championship | 3 | 0 | 0 | 0 | 2 | 0 | — | | — | | 5 | 0 |
| Southampton | 2016–17 | Premier League | 0 | 0 | 0 | 0 | 0 | 0 | 0 | 0 | — | | 0 | 0 |
| Southampton | 2017–18 | Premier League | 0 | 0 | 0 | 0 | 0 | 0 | 0 | 0 | — | | 0 | 0 |
| Southampton | Total | | 0 | 0 | 0 | 0 | 0 | 0 | 0 | 0 | — | | 0 | 0 |
| Career totals | | | 75 | 0 | 4 | 0 | 9 | 0 | 7 | 0 | 0 | 0 | 95 | 0 |

== Honours ==
Arsenal

- Premier League: 2001–02
- FA Cup: 2002–03
- FA Charity/Community Shield: 1999, 2002
