= Moustapha Salifou =

Togolese footballer (born 1983)

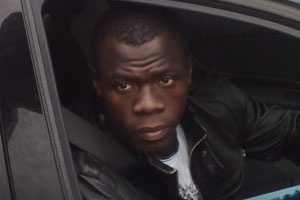
- Salifou in 2007

Personal information
- Full name: Moustapha Salifou
- Date of birth: 1 June 1983 (age 43)
- Place of birth: Lomé, Togo
- Height: 1.80 m (5 ft 11 in)
- Position: Midfielder

Team information
- Current team: TKSV Donauwörth

Senior career*
Years	Team	Apps	(Gls)
1998–2002	AC Merlan		
2002–2006	Rot-Weiß Oberhausen	33	(1)
2005–2006	→ Brest (loan)	7	(0)
2006–2007	FC Wil	23	(2)
2007–2011	Aston Villa	4	(0)
2011–2012	1. FC Saarbrücken	11	(1)
2014	1860 Rosenheim	12	(1)
2015–2024	Türkspor Augsburg	168	(7)
2024–2025	RB Petrolspor München	7	(1)
2025–2026	FC Dreistern Neutrudering	0	(0)
2026–	FC TKSV Donauwörth	0	(0)

International career
2000–2013	Togo	77	(8)
- * Club domestic league appearances and goals

Moustapha Salifou (born 1 June 1983) is a Togolese professional footballer who plays as a midfielder for TKSV Donauwörth. He has represented the Togo national team at the 2006 FIFA World Cup. He spent four years at English Premier League club Aston Villa, the rest of his professional career has been spent at lower levels of the German, French and Swiss league systems.

== Club career ==
=== Early career ===
Born in Lomé, Salifou started his career in his native Togo with AC Merlan. The midfielder had fleeting stints with Swiss side FC Wil, French team Brest and German team Rot-Weiß Oberhausen, prior to moving to England.

=== Aston Villa ===
On 31 August 2007, Salifou signed a one-year deal with Aston Villa, joining for a nominal fee after a successful trial. Martin O'Neill commented that "He has great determination to succeed at this level and may well prove to be an excellent asset". Salifou encountered problems acquiring a work permit though, and was forced to train with his old club in Switzerland.

It was reported on 25 September 2007 that the work permit had been granted and that Salifou was to join up with the squad within a week, however, he did not join up with his new club until 18 October 2007. Salifou made his debut for Aston Villa Reserves on 22 October 2007 creating two of the goals in a 6–0 win over Chelsea reserves. He made his debut for the first team on 12 January 2008 as a 90th-minute substitute in a 3–1 win against Reading. Despite not having played a game, his name was chanted loudly to the tune of the Boney M. song Daddy Cool by the Holte End. He was later rewarded with a one-year extension to his contract. Salifou made his second appearance for the club on 15 March 2008, coming on as a late substitute in the 2–0 away defeat at Portsmouth, as well as appearing in the 4–0 defeat to Manchester United. On 6 November 2008, Martin O'Neill decided to change his starting eleven for Villa's UEFA Cup match against Slavia Prague. Salifou started and played the full ninety minutes.

Despite rarely featuring for the club at all during the 2009–10 season, Salifou was named in caretaker manager Kevin MacDonald's 22-man Premier League squad for 2010–11. He failed to make an impact during this season too, and underwent a trial at AS Monaco in January 2011. With the arrival of Jean Makoun to Villa in January 2011, Salifou found himself without a squad number for a period after the number 17 shirt was given to Makoun. However, he was later given the number 37. Throughout this time Salifou was praised for his time with the reserves, often passing on his experience to the Villa youngsters. On 27 May, Aston Villa announced that Salifou was one of a number of players who was released by the club after their contracts expired.

=== Later career ===
Salifou remained a free agent until November 2011, when he signed a two-year deal with 1. FC Saarbrücken. He took the number 16 shirt on arrival at the German club. He made his début for the team as an 80th-minute substitute for Marcel Ziemer in a 3–1 win over Kickers Offenbach on 26 November 2011. He scored his first goal for Saarbrücken in a 5–2 win over former club Rot-Weiß Oberhausen on 10 December. He was released by Saarbrücken at the end of the season. Despite not being registered to a club, Salifou continued to represent Togo internationally and had been linked with a transfer to former club FC Wil.

On 1 March 2014, Salifou signed for German club Rosenheim of the Regionalliga Bayern, the fourth tier of German football. After making his début against SV Heimstetten, Salifou went on to make 11 appearances for the club in the 2013–14 season including three assists and one goal against TSV 1860 Munich II.

Salifou joined Türkspor Augsburg in 2015, playing in the Landesliga Bayern-Südwest. In early 2016 he was banned for eight matches for shouting at a referee during a match. In August 2021, he announced in an interview, his intention to retire at the end of the 2021–22 season.

Salifou joined German amateur Kreisklasse club RB Petrolspor München for the 2024–25 season.

== International career ==
Salifou was a member of the Togo national team, and was called up to the 2006 FIFA World Cup. He played in all three of Togo's group games in that World Cup against South Korea, Switzerland and France.

The midfielder earned glowing reports after a positive performance at the 2006 World Cup, which alerted the attention of many French league clubs, and prompted the nickname the 'Togolese Zidane' or 'the great of the figure of eight' from his compatriot Emmanuel Adebayor, due to Salifou's playmaking nature.

On 8 January 2010, the bus containing the Togo squad for the Africa Cup of Nations was subjected to an attack from gunmen; Salifou was on the bus during the attack who was said to be 'shaken but okay' after the incident.

== Career statistics ==
=== Club ===
Appearances and goals by club, season and competition
Club	Season	League			National cup		League cup		Europe		Total	
Club	Season	Division	Apps	Goals	Apps	Goals	Apps	Goals	Apps	Goals	Apps	Goals
Rot-Weiß Oberhausen	2002–03	2. Bundesliga	11	1	1	0	0	0	—		12	1
Rot-Weiß Oberhausen	2003–04	2. Bundesliga	6	0	0	0	0	0	—		6	0
Rot-Weiß Oberhausen	2004–05	2. Bundesliga	16	0	0	0	0	0	—		16	0
Rot-Weiß Oberhausen	Total		33	1	1	0	0	0	0	0	34	1
Brest (loan)	2005–06	Ligue 2	7	0	0	0	1	0	—		8	0
FC Wil	2006–07	Swiss Challenge League	19	2	4	0	0	0	—		23	2
FC Wil	2007–08	Swiss Challenge League	4	0	0	0	0	0	—		4	0
FC Wil	Total		23	2	4	0	0	0	0	0	27	2
Aston Villa	2007–08	Premier League	4	0	0	0	0	0	—		4	0
Aston Villa	2008–09	Premier League	0	0	1	0	0	0	8	0	9	0
Aston Villa	2009–10	Premier League	0	0	0	0	0	0	—		0	0
Aston Villa	2010–11	Premier League	0	0	0	0	0	0	—		0	0
Aston Villa	Total		4	0	1	0	0	0	8	0	13	0
1. FC Saarbrücken	2011–12	3. Liga	11	1	0	0	0	0	—		11	1
TSV 1860 Rosenheim	2013–14	Regionalliga	12	1	1	0	0	0	—		13	1
Career total			90	5	7	0	1	0	8	0	106	5

=== International ===
Appearances and goals by national team and year
National team	Year	Apps	Goals
Togo	2000	5	1
Togo	2001	6	2
Togo	2002	3	0
Togo	2003	3	1
Togo	2004	3	0
Togo	2005	5	1
Togo	2006	7	0
Togo	2007	4	0
Togo	2008	5	1
Togo	2009	6	1
Togo	2010	5	0
Togo	2011	1	0
Togo	2012	9	0
Togo	2013	6	1
Total		66	8

Scores and results list Togo's goal tally first, score column indicates score after each Salifou goal.

List of international goals scored by Moustapha Salifou
No.	Date	Venue	Opponent	Score	Result	Competition
1	23 April 2000	Stade de Kégué, Lomé, Togo	Guinea-Bissau	1-0	3-0	2002 FIFA World cup qualification
2	23 February 2001	28 March Stadium, Benghazi, Libya	Libya^{[a]}	1-1	3-3	2002 FIFA World cup qualification
3	16 December 2001	Stade du 4 Août, Ouagadougou, Burkina Faso	Burkina Faso	1-1	1-2	Friendly
4	16 November 2002	Stade de Kégué, Lomé, Togo	Equatorial Guinea	2-0	2-0	2006 FIFA World cup qualification
5	27 March 2005	Stade Modibo Kéïta, Bamako, Mali	Mali	1-1	2-1	2006 FIFA World cup qualification
6	11 October 2008	Accra Sports Stadium, Accra, Ghana	Swaziland^{[b]}	1-0	6-0	2010 FIFA World cup qualification
7	6 September 2009	Stade de Kégué, Lomé, Togo	Morocco	1-0	1-1	2010 FIFA World cup qualification
8	5 June 2013	Estadio de Bata, Bata, Equatorial Guinea	Equatorial Guinea	1-0	1-0	Friendly

- ^{a} Libya's flag at the time of match.
- ^{b} Eswatini's country name at time of match.
  - ^{b} Eswatini's flag at time of match.
