= Nigel Reo-Coker =

English footballer (born 1984)

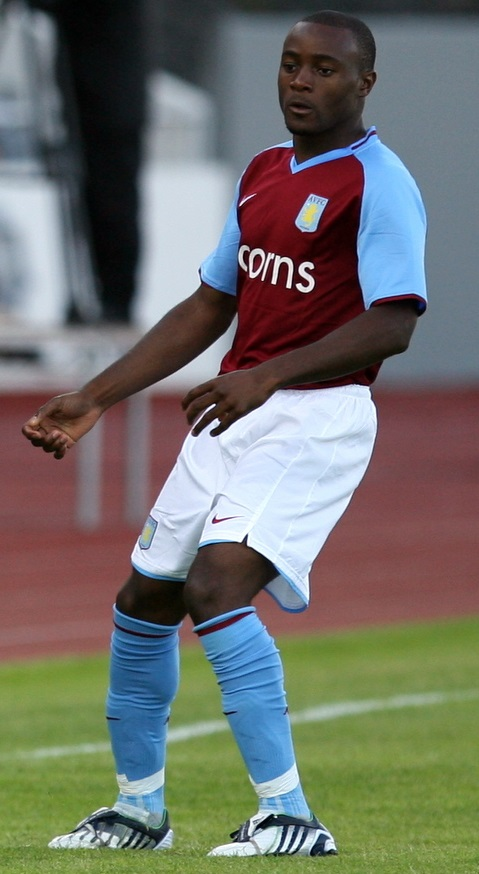
- Reo-Coker in 2008

Personal information
- Full name: Nigel Shola Andre Reo-Coker
- Date of birth: 14 May 1984 (age 42)
- Place of birth: Southwark, England
- Height: 5 ft 10 in (1.78 m)
- Position: Midfielder

Youth career
- 1997–2002: Wimbledon

Senior career*
Years	Team	Apps	(Gls)
2002–2004	Wimbledon	58	(6)
2004–2007	West Ham United	120	(11)
2007–2011	Aston Villa	102	(1)
2011–2012	Bolton Wanderers	37	(3)
2012–2013	Ipswich Town	10	(0)
2013–2014	Vancouver Whitecaps FC	44	(1)
2014	Chivas USA	9	(0)
2015–2016	Montreal Impact	31	(0)
2017	Start	2	(0)
2018	Milton Keynes Dons	0	(0)
Total		413	(22)

International career
2003	England U19	1	(0)
2005	England U20	3	(0)
2003–2007	England U21	23	(1)
Medal record
England
UEFA European U-21 Championship
Bronze medal – third place	2007 Netherlands
- * Club domestic league appearances and goals as of 14:57, 28 June 2018 (UTC)

Nigel Shola Andre Reo-Coker (born 14 May 1984) is an English former professional footballer who played as a midfielder, as well as a football commentator and pundit for CBS Sports.

Reo-Coker came through the youth team ranks at Wimbledon, and has previously played for West Ham United, Aston Villa, Bolton Wanderers, Ipswich Town, Vancouver Whitecaps FC, Chivas USA, Montreal Impact, Start and Milton Keynes Dons.

== Early life ==
Reo-Coker was born at Guy's Hospital in Southwark, London, but lived in Sierra Leone for the first six years of his life, after his parents moved there to work, with his sisters Natalie and Vanessa. His father, Ransford, was a general practitioner and his mother Agnes was a nurse, and after the two separated in 1990, Agnes returned to south London with her children. He has a son called Andrew Coker. Reo-Coker attended Riddlesdown High School in Purley, London.

== Club career ==
=== Wimbledon ===
Reo-Coker was spotted by London club Wimbledon at the age of twelve after representing the borough of Croydon. He came through the ranks at Wimbledon and became captain after progressing to the first team. He also made his debut for the England Under-21s while at Wimbledon. In March 2003, Portsmouth manager Harry Redknapp agreed a deal to bring Reo-Coker to the south coast club in preparation for their first Premiership season. Financial problems resulted in the player remaining at Wimbledon despite having already signed contracts with Portsmouth. Reo-Coker made 64 appearances for Wimbledon in all competitions, scoring six goals.

=== West Ham United ===
Reo-Coker playing for West Ham United in 2006

After an impressive first half of the 2003–04 season, he signed for West Ham in January 2004. After the move, Reo-Coker stated that he joined West Ham United, believing the club can bounce back to the Premier League. He made his West Ham debut on 31 January 2004 in a 2–1 home win against Rotherham United. His first West Ham goal came on 9 March 2004 against his former club, Wimbledon as he scored the fourth goal in a 5–0 win. He quickly became a regular member of Alan Pardew's first team and was made the club captain. In his first season West Ham made the 2004 First Division play-off final but lost 1–0 in Cardiff to Crystal Palace. In his second season, he scored three times and played 39 matches from a possible 46 matches to help the club win promotion to the Premier League in 2004–05 through the play-offs and led the team to the FA Cup final in May 2006, becoming the youngest ever FA Cup final captain in history at the age of 21.

The 2006–07 Premiership campaign began less successfully for West Ham, and Reo-Coker was singled out by some groups as being the main culprit for this slump, which left West Ham perilously close to the bottom three and ultimately led to the sacking of manager Alan Pardew. New manager Alan Curbishley identified him as being part of the team which had lost direction and was in danger of being relegated back to the Championship. Reo-Coker recovered his form in the latter part of the season and a run of seven wins in nine matches, inspired by Carlos Tevez, saw West Ham escape relegation on the last day of the season with a 1–0 win at Manchester United, which turned out to be Reo-Coker's last appearance for West Ham.

Reo-Coker intended to sort his future out in the summer before the 2007–08 season, saying in May 2007, "I do not know what my future is and need to sit down and talk with the manager and the chairman this week. I have been through the mill this season, but it has made me a stronger person and I would not have changed anything. I am a very loyal person but to play at my best I need to be happy. I made a promise to West Ham fans that I would help keep this club in the Premier League and I have done that." He requested a transfer at the end of the 2006–07 season after the board failed to reassure him concerning his future at West Ham. Aston Villa were reported to have made a £7m bid for Reo-Coker in June and in July 2007, West Ham and Aston Villa reached an agreement in the region of £8.5 million. He made 142 appearances in all competitions for West Ham scoring 11 goals. He was also booked 33 times.

=== Aston Villa ===
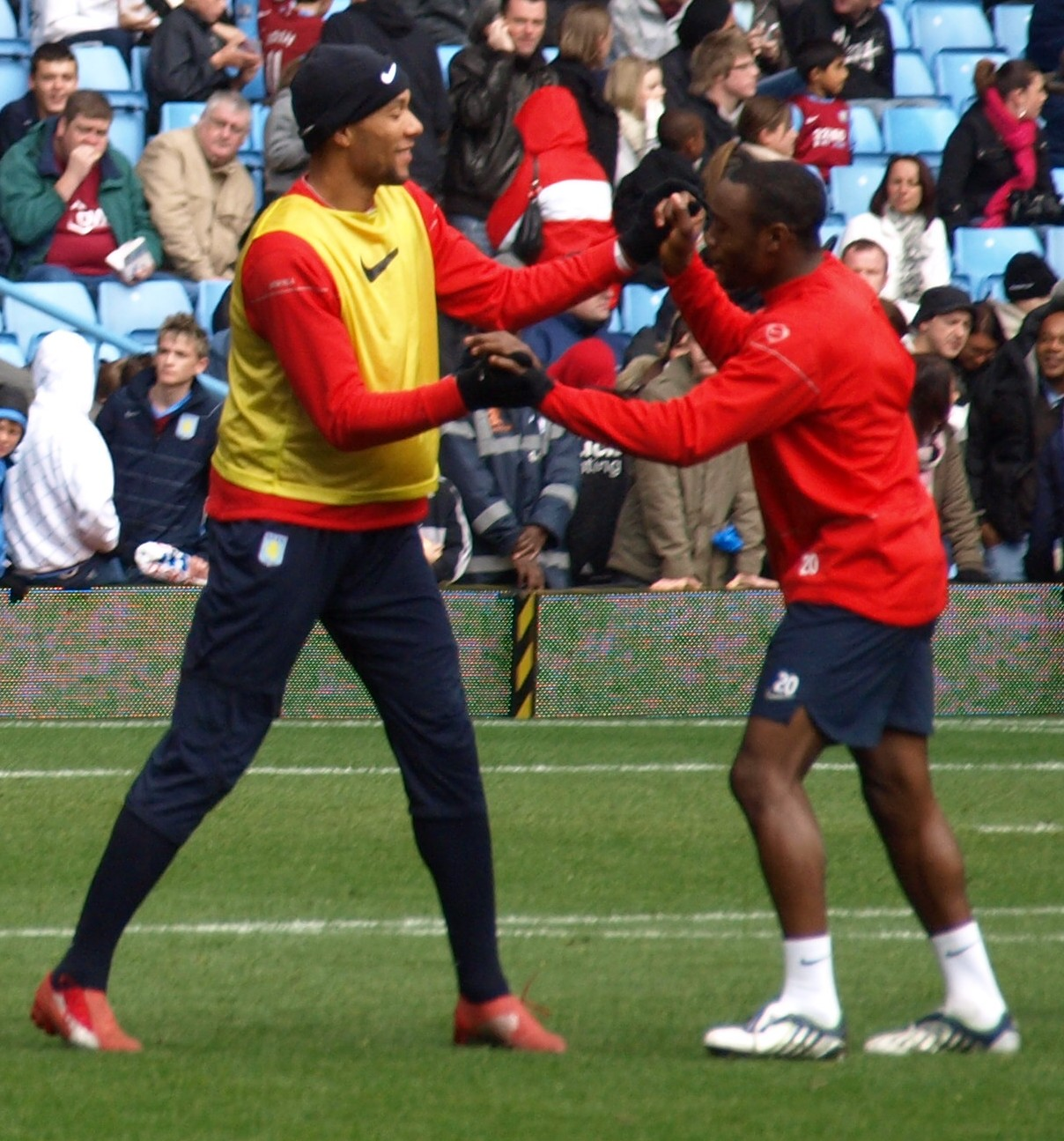
Reo-Coker (right) warming up for Aston Villa in 2009

Reo-Coker joined Aston Villa on 5 July 2007 for a reported £8.5 million, signing a four-year contract. At the press conference following the signing, he spoke of being "hung out to dry" by his former club, West Ham United, and said that his reason for joining Villa was, "their aspiration to play in Europe; they have a talented squad and Martin O'Neill has told me what he aims to do and I believe we can achieve it." He scored his first goal for Villa in a 5–0 League Cup 2nd round victory over Wrexham on 28 August 2007. On 21 January 2008, Reo-Coker captained Aston Villa in the absence of regular captain Gareth Barry against Liverpool at Anfield. He scored his first Premier League goal for Aston Villa in a 2–1 win over Tottenham at White Hart Lane. He then scored again later that week to equalise for Villa in the UEFA Cup against Litex Lovech. Villa went on to win this match 3–1. During his time at Villa, Reo-Coker was known to operate as a right-back and right-winger occasionally when players who would usually play in those positions were unavailable.

Reo-Coker captained Aston Villa in the latter stages of the 2009 Peace Cup, following an injury to teammate Stiliyan Petrov. This was the case in the final, as Villa were triumphant and Reo-Coker consequently lifted the trophy. He re-established himself as a regular starter in the Villa team following the departure of Gareth Barry. On 18 September 2009, he was involved in a training ground incident, described as a "strong verbal disagreement" with manager Martin O'Neill and dropped for the following day's match with Portsmouth. A few weeks later, Reo-Coker was recalled by O'Neill, having been called ahead of a match.

Reo-Coker enjoyed a resurgence at the start of the 2010–11 season under new Villa manager Gérard Houllier and following news in October 2010 that captain Petrov would be out injured for two months, Houllier named him as captain until Petrov's return. On 27 May 2011, Aston Villa announced that Nigel Reo-Coker had left the club following his contract expiring. After being released, he would accuse the club's chief of not contacting him about his release.

=== Bolton Wanderers ===
Reo-Coker joined Bolton Wanderers in July 2011 on a free transfer following his release from Villa, signing a two-year contract. Manager Owen Coyle described him as having the "...quality, drive and desire to compete at the highest level in the Premier League..." He made his debut in the 4–0 away win at Queens Park Rangers in the next month and scored his first goal for the club in Bolton's 2–1 away win against Blackburn Rovers in December 2011. He went on to make 42 league and cup appearances for Bolton, scoring three goals. Bolton struggled during the 2011–12 season and following relegation from the Premier League at the end of the season, Reo-Coker activated a release clause in his contract and left the club.

=== Ipswich Town ===
Reo-Coker joined Ipswich Town in October 2012, saying, "Ipswich are a sleeping giant in the Championship — a massive club with a great history. It's the right club at the right time for me and everything has fallen into place." He made twelve appearances before departing the club in January 2013 after turning down the offer of an extended contract until June 2013.

=== Vancouver Whitecaps FC ===
On 20 February 2013, Reo-Coker accepted an offer from MLS club Vancouver Whitecaps FC. His Discovery Rights had been held by the Whitecaps' local rivals Portland Timbers, but he expressed a desire to play for the Vancouver club instead having been impressed with the professionalism of Vancouver head coach Martin Rennie. Vancouver traded its second-round picks in the 2014 MLS SuperDraft and 2015 MLS SuperDraft to Portland in exchange for the right to sign Reo-Coker.

Reo-Coker made his debut for the club in a 1–0 win over Toronto on 3 March 2013, where he made 38 passes in the 45 minutes played, misplacing just eight of the total 46 during the match. He soon became known for his tough-tackling following a match against San Jose Earthquakes, in which he flipped midfielder Sam Cronin with a tackle in front of the referee. He was given a warning for the tackle. On 27 April 2013, Reo-Coker was awarded Man of the Match for his performance.

Reo-Coker scored his first ever MLS goal in a 4–1 win over Seattle Sounders FC on 9 October 2013.

=== Chivas USA ===
On 21 August 2014, Reo-Coker was traded to MLS club Chivas USA for Mauro Rosales. Following the league's decision to fold the club following the 2014 MLS season, he was made available for the 2014 MLS Dispersal Draft but was not selected.

=== Montreal Impact ===
Reo-Coker was drafted by Montreal Impact in the MLS Waiver Draft on 10 December 2014. His contract was terminated by mutual consent on 21 January 2016.

=== Post-Major League Soccer ===
On 12 April 2017, Reo-Coker joined La Liga club Granada CF on trial with a view to contract until the end of the 2016–17 season.

On 3 May 2017, Reo-Coker joined IK Start in the Norwegian first division. On 26 June 2017, the club terminated his contract.

In March 2018, it was reported that having trained with them for "several weeks", Milton Keynes Dons were "keen" to sign Reo-Coker, thus setting up a return to Milton Keynes, 14 years after he left Wimbledon during their National Hockey Stadium years. On 22 March 2018, Reo-Coker joined the club on a short-term deal until the end of the 2017–18 season, but failed to make a single appearance and later retired from football.

== International career ==
=== England ===
Reo-Coker was first selected for the England under-21 squad against Turkey in October 2003. On 24 March 2007, Reo-Coker led out England Under 21s against Italy Under 21s, becoming the first Englishman to captain a team at the new Wembley Stadium. The match finished 3–3.

In May 2006, Reo-Coker was named as the standby midfield player for England's 2006 World Cup squad. However, on 22 May the FA announced that Reo-Coker would be replaced by Phil Neville as Reo-Coker's back problems made him unable to compete in the World Cup.

He captained the England U21s throughout the 2007 UEFA European Under-21 Championship. A second booking in the tournament received needlessly in the semi-final against the hosts, the Netherlands, meant he would have missed the final if England had progressed. Due to his age, it also meant that the match would be his last for the team. The semi-final went to penalties and the Netherlands eventually won 13–12, with Reo-Coker's penalty being saved in the shootout.

=== Eligibility for Sierra Leone ===
Reo-Coker is of Sierra Leonean descent and stated in 2006 that he would consider any future call-ups to the Sierra Leone national team. In May 2010, Sierra Leone Football Association president Nahim Khadi expressed his interest in inviting Reo-Coker to join up with Sierra Leone for their 2014 FIFA World Cup qualification campaign. Khadi said that the player's great "leadership and experience" would be a great asset to the team.

On 20 September 2010, it was reported that Sierra Leone manager Christian Cole had decided to pencil Reo-Coker in to his squad for the 2012 Africa Cup of Nations qualifying match against South Africa. However, Reo-Coker later rejected the chance to represent the nation, stating that he wished to concentrate on his football at Aston Villa and maybe even return to the England set-up in the future.

== Career statistics ==
As of match played 18 June 2017

Appearances and goals by club, season and competition
Club	Season	League			National cup (Note: Includes FA Cup, Canadian Championship, Norwegian Football Cup)		League cup (Note: Includes Football League Cup)		Continental		Other		Total	
Club	Season	Division	Apps	Goals	Apps	Goals	Apps	Goals	Apps	Goals	Apps	Goals	Apps	Goals
Wimbledon	2001–02	First Division	1	0	—		—		—		—		1	0
Wimbledon	2002–03	First Division	32	2	2	0	2	0	—		—		36	2
Wimbledon	2003–04	First Division	25	4	1	0	1	0	—		—		27	4
Wimbledon	Total		58	6	3	0	3	0	—		—		64	6
West Ham United	2003–04	First Division	15	2	—		—		—		3 (Note: Appearances in Football League First Division play-offs)	0	18	2
West Ham United	2004–05	Championship	39	3	2	0	3	0	—		3 (Note: Appearances in Championship play-offs)	0	47	3
West Ham United	2005–06	Premier League	31	5	7	0	0	0	—		—		38	5
West Ham United	2006–07	Premier League	35	1	1	0	1	0	2 (Note: Appearances in UEFA Cup)	0	—		39	1
West Ham United	Total		120	11	10	0	4	0	2	0	6	0	142	11
Aston Villa	2007–08	Premier League	36	0	1	0	2	1	—		—		39	1
Aston Villa	2008–09	Premier League	26	1	2	0	0	0	8	1	—		36	2
Aston Villa	2009–10	Premier League	10	0	1	0	1	0	1 (Note: Appearance in UEFA Europa League)	0	—		13	0
Aston Villa	2010–11	Premier League	30	0	2	0	2	0	1	0	—		35	0
Aston Villa	Total		102	1	6	0	5	1	10	1	—		123	3
Bolton Wanderers	2011–12	Premier League	37	3	5	0	0	0	—		—		42	3
Ipswich Town	2012–13	Championship	10	0	1	0	0	0	—		—		11	0
Vancouver Whitecaps FC	2013	MLS	32	1	3	0	—		—		0	0	35	1
Vancouver Whitecaps FC	2014	MLS	12	0	2	0	—		—		0	0	14	0
Vancouver Whitecaps FC	Total		44	1	5	0	—		—		0	0	49	1
Chivas USA	2014	MLS	9	0	0	0	—		—		—		9	0
Montreal Impact	2015	MLS	31	0	3	0	—		6 (Note: Appearances in CONCACAF Champions League)	0	—		40	0
Start	2017	Norwegian First Division	2	0	1	0	—		—		—		3	0
Milton Keynes Dons	2017–18	League One	0	0	—		—		—		—		0	0
Career total			413	22	34	0	12	1	18	1	6	0	483	24

== Honours ==
West Ham United

- Football League Championship play-offs: 2005
- FA Cup runner-up: 2005–06

Montreal Impact

- CONCACAF Champions League runner-up: 2014–15
