= Arsène Menessou =

Beninese footballer (born 1987)

Personal information
- Full name: Arsène Menessou Gbougnon
- Date of birth: 3 December 1987 (age 38)
- Place of birth: Abidjan, Ivory Coast
- Height: 1.77 m (5 ft 10 in)
- Position: Right-back

Team information
- Current team: Schifflange 95
- Number: 23

Senior career*
Years	Team	Apps	(Gls)
2005–2007	Le Havre B		
2007–2009	Beauvais	44	(1)
2009–2011	Real Zaragoza B	28	(0)
2011–2012	Eupen	0	(0)
2012–2013	La Louvière Centre	32	(2)
2013–2015	Virton	52	(2)
2015–2016	Jeunesse Esch	25	(2)
2016–2017	Hamm Benfica	22	(0)
2017–2020	Jeunesse Esch	50	(4)
2021	Schengen		
2021–	Schifflange 95		

International career
2011–2013	Benin	9	(0)
- * Club domestic league appearances and goals as of 1 July 2019

Arsène Menessou Gbougnon (born 3 December 1987) is a Beninese professional footballer who plays for FC Schifflange 95, as a right-back. Between 2011 and 2013, he made nine appearances for the Benin national team.

== Career ==
Born in Abidjan, Ivory Coast, Menessou has played club football for Le Havre B, Beauvais, Real Zaragoza B, Eupen, La Louvière Centre, Virton, Jeunesse Esch and Hamm Benfica.

He made his international debut for Benin in 2011.
