= Umit Eminoglu =

Footballer (born 1994)

Yewmin Eminoglu
Personal information
- Full name: umit Yucel Eminoglu
- Date of birth: 14 September 1994 (age 32)
- Place of birth: Solihull, England
- Position: Midfielder

Youth career
- 2002–2013: Aston Villa

Senior career*
Years	Team	Apps	(Gls)
2013	Gençlerbirliği	0	(0)
2013–2014	Hednesford Town	2	(0)
2013–2014	→ Redditch United (loan)	2	(2)
2014	Halesowen Town	1	(2)
2014	Giresunspor	0	(0)
2014	Redditch United		
2014	Barwell	0	(0)
2014–2015	Studley	4	(1)
2015	Banbury United	3	(0)
2015	Littleton	1	(0)
2015	Bartley Green Illey	11	(7)
2015	Boldmere St Michaels	4	(0)
2015	Sancaktepe	4	(0)
2015–2016	Stourport Swifts	7	(1)
2016	Bromsgrove Sporting	4	(1)
2016–2019	Feckenham	37	(15)
2019–2020	Darlaston Town (1874)		
2020–2021	Feckenham		
2021–2022	Alcester Town	2	(2)
Total		82	(31)

International career
2012	Turkey U18	3	(0)
- * Club domestic league appearances and goals

Umit Yucel Eminoglu (Turkish: Ümit Yücel Eminoğlu; born 14 September 1994) is a football coach and former player who is a youth coach at Walsall.

He began his career with English Premier League side Aston Villa, spending 11 years in their academy without making a first-team appearance before he was released in 2013.

He has played for clubs in both England and Turkey, he made his professional debut in 2013 with Gençlerbirliği and after a short spell in English non-league football, briefly played for Giresunspor of the TFF First League and later Sancaktepe Belediyespor of the TFF Second League. He later returned to England to rejoin former club Redditch United, and short spells with a number of sides in the Midland Football Combination in 2014 and 2015, including Banbury United.

Eminoglu opted to represent Turkey internationally and has been capped at youth level.

== Club career ==
Eminoglu progressed through the academy at Aston Villa, scoring nine times in the Premier Academy League in the 2011–12 season. He left in 2013 and signed a three-year contract with Turkish Süper Lig side Gençlerbirliği. On 25 September 2013, Eminoglu made his full professional debut for the Ankara-based club in the second round of the 2013–14 Turkish Cup. He came off the bench to replace Doğa Kaya in the 82nd minute of Gençlerbirliği's 2–1 victory over third-tier club Sarıyer.

However, his stay in Turkey was to be short-lived and he returned to England to sign for Hednesford Town of the Conference North in December 2013. He made two substitute appearances for Hednesford before becoming dual-registered with Redditch United later that month, scoring two goals in his first game against Bideford on 17 December 2013. He moved from Hednesford to Halesowen Town in January 2014, making just one substitute appearance against Rainworth Miners Welfare that month before departing.

In July 2014, he returned to Turkey to go on trial with newly promoted TFF First League club Giresunspor. He was one of a group of Giresunspor players who passed medical examinations on 24 July 2014. On 31 July, he was named in Giresunspor's 26-man squad for the 2014–15 season.

However, he once again returned to England shortly after. He made just one Turkish Cup appearance for Giresunspor before it was announced that he was to rejoin former club Redditch United in October 2014, subject to international clearance. He later played for Studley at the end of 2014 before moving on to play for Banbury United and Littleton. He signed for Bartley Green Illey F.C. on 27 February, and then joined Boldmere St. Michaels. He signed for Bromsgrove Sporting in June 2015. Eminoglu had another brief spell in Turkey, playing for the 3.Lig side Sancaktepe Belediyespor in late 2015 before returning to Bromsgrove Sporting.

On 2 July 2021, Eminoglu signed for Midland League Division Two side Alcester Town. In January 2022, Eminoglu was banned until the end of the season, after being accused of throwing mud at a referee during a game.

== Coaching career ==
In August 2022, Eminoglu joined Kidderminster Harriers as a coach, after obtaining his UEFA B Licence. In August 2023, he joined Walsall as a Youth Coach.

== International career ==
Eminoglu is eligible to represent both Turkey and England at international level. He has earned three caps for Turkey's under-18 side.
