= David Bevan (footballer) =

Irish footballer (born 1989)

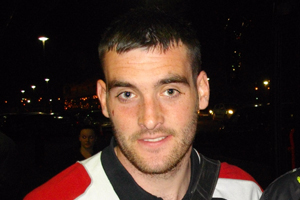
- Bevan in 2011

Personal information
- Full name: David Bevan
- Date of birth: 24 June 1989 (age 37)
- Place of birth: Cork, Ireland
- Height: 6 ft 2 in (1.88 m)
- Position: Goalkeeper

Team information
- Current team: AFC Rushden & Diamonds
- Number: 30

Youth career
- –2004: College Corinthians
- 2004–2008: Aston Villa
- 2006: → Hull City (loan)

Senior career*
Years	Team	Apps	(Gls)
2008–2010	Aston Villa	0	(0)
2008	→ Tamworth (loan)	7	(0)
2009	→ Ilkeston Town (loan)	4	(0)
2009	→ Bedworth United (loan)	8	(0)
2009–2010	→ Solihull Moors (loan)	2	(0)
2010–2011	Walsall	4	(0)
2011	Daventry Town	12	(0)
2011	Evesham United	3	(0)
2011–2012	Hinckley United	2	(0)
2011–2012	→ Sutton Coldfield Town (loan)	?	(?)
2012–2013	Rugby Town	57	(0)
2013–2014	Boldmere St. Michaels	?	(?)
2014	AFC Rushden & Diamonds	1	(0)
- * Club domestic league appearances and goals as of 23:12, 20 July 2013 (UTC)

David Bevan (born 24 June 1989) is an Irish footballer who most recently played for AFC Rushden & Diamonds as a goalkeeper. He began his career with Aston Villa in the Premier League, but left for League One side Walsall without making a first-team appearance at Villa Park. After a single season at Walsall, he dropped to non-league football. Bevan has also represented the Republic of Ireland at various youth levels.

== Career ==
=== Aston Villa ===
Born in Cork, Ireland, Bevan joined English football at the start of the 2004–2005 season when he joined Aston Villa's academy from College Corinthians. He joined up with Hull City on loan for part of the 2006–07 season, making a few youth team appearances for the club. After returning to Villa, Bevan found first and reserve team chances limited and was sent out on an initial month's loan to Conference North side Tamworth, on 23 September 2008 to gain some experience.

==== Tamworth (loan) ====
Bevan made his debut for the Lambs on 27 September 2008 in the FA Cup 2nd Qualifying Round tie away at Worcester City, which ended in a 1–0 away win at St. George's Lane. The loan was eventually extended for an extra month. He made twelve first team appearances in all competitions during his loan spell, this included getting a red card in the FA Cup tie with Barrow. His final appearance for Tamworth came in the league in the 1–2 defeat to Alfreton Town at The Lamb Ground on 9 December.

==== Ilkeston Town (loan) ====
At the start of the 2009–10 season he was sent out on loan again this time to Conference North side Ilkeston Town. His debut came on 8 August in the league away at Droylsden, where the Robins lost 2–0 at the Butcher's Arms Ground. His final appearance for Ilkeston came in the league tie with Corby Town on 19 August, which ended 2–2 at Rockingham Triangle.

==== Solihull Moors (loan) ====
His final loan spell away from Villa Park came when he joined Conference North side Solihull Moors on a month's loan on 4 December 2009. He made his debut for the Moors against Southport in a 3–0 away defeat at Haig Avenue.

=== Walsall ===
His stay at Villa came to an end in the summer of 2010 when his contract expired and he was released. He was offered a contract by League One side Walsall, and completed the deal on 14 July 2010. He was persuaded to sign from the recently departed Saddler and Republic of Ireland U19 teammate and goalkeeper Rene Gilmartin. He made his debut for the Saddlers on 8 January 2011 in the league clash away at Tranmere Rovers, which ended in a 3–3 draw at Prenton Park. Over the course of the remainder of the season, Bevan made three more appearances for Walsall, but in spite of the fact that he had overtaken rival Jonny Brain in the goalkeeping pecking order, he was released at the end of the campaign by Saddlers manager Dean Smith.

=== Non-League ===
Following his release from Walsall, Bevan joined up with Daventry Town, managed by former Aston Villa player Mark Kinsella. He remained there for three months, covering for regular Daventry goalkeeper Joe Mellings who was out with an injury. He moved on to Evesham United in November 2011, playing three games in total for the club. He soon moved on to play for Hinckley United, joining up with former Aston Villa teammate Calum Flanagan. He moved on once again in December, signing with Sutton Coldfield Town of the Northern Premier League Division One South on loan. He was dual-registered, allowing him to play for both Sutton Coldfield Town and Hinckley United. In January 2012, Bevan signed for Rugby Town. He made 55 league appearances for Rugby before moving on to Boldmere St. Michaels ahead of the 2013–14 season. He joined AFC Rushden & Diamonds in November 2014 but only made one appearance.
