= Thomas Dau =

Austrian footballer

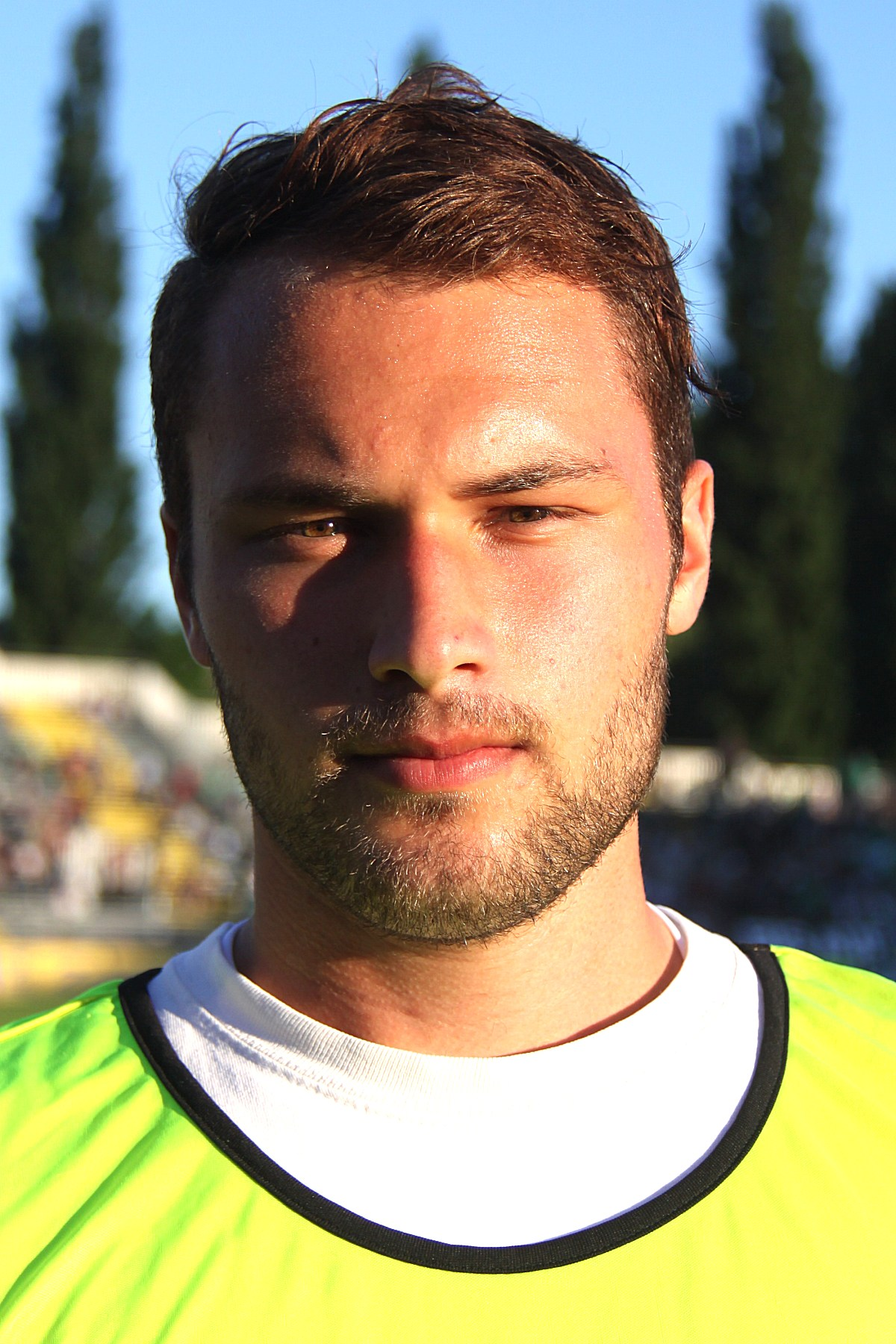
- Dau in 2013

Personal information
- Full name: Thomas Dau
- Date of birth: 9 August 1991 (age 35)
- Place of birth: Kittsee, Austria
- Height: 1.89 m (6 ft 2 in)
- Position: Goalkeeper

Team information
- Current team: ASK Mannersdorf
- Number: 1

Youth career
- 2005–2007: AKA Burgenland
- 2007–2008: SV Schwechat
- 2008–2010: Aston Villa

Senior career*
Years	Team	Apps	(Gls)
2010–2011	SV Horn	0	(0)
2011–2013	Rapid Wien II	14	(0)
2012	→ First Vienna (loan)	15	(0)
2013–2014	SV Mattersburg		
2015	SpVgg Unterhaching II	2	(0)
2015–2018	SV Wimpassing	91	(1)
2018	SC Sommerein		
2019–2020	FC-Hill Jois	0	(0)
2021–	ASK Mannersdorf	38	(0)

Managerial career
- 2017: SC Kittsee (youth coach)
- * Club domestic league appearances and goals

Thomas Dau (born 9 August 1991) is an Austrian footballer who plays for ASK Mannersdorf.
