= 2008–09 Watford F.C. season =

English football team season

Watford
2008–09 season
- Chairman: Graham Simpson (until December 2008); Jimmy Russo (from December 2008)
- Manager: Aidy Boothroyd (until October 2008); Malky Mackay (caretaker in November 2008); Brendan Rodgers (November 2008 – June 2009); Malky Mackay (June 2009)
- Stadium: Vicarage Road
- Football League Championship: 13th
- FA Cup: Fifth round (eliminated by Chelsea)
- League Cup: Fifth round (eliminated by Tottenham Hotspur)
- Top goalscorer: League: Tommy Smith (17); All: Tommy Smith (17)
- Highest home attendance: 16,386 (vs Wolverhampton Wanderers, 25 October 2008)
- Lowest home attendance: 13,193 (vs Burnley, 27 January 2010)
- Average home league attendance: 14,858
Home colours	Away colours

Watford Football Club are an association football team from the county of Hertfordshire, England. Waford has played in the Championship since being relegated from the Premier League in 2006–07. The club finished the season in 13th position out of 24 Championship teams. The club went through four managers during the season.

== Background, review and events ==
The 2008–09 season was their second consecutive one in the Football League Championship, following relegation from the Premier League in 2006–07.

They reached the fifth round of both the League Cup and FA Cup, where they were eliminated by Premier League sides Tottenham Hotspur and Chelsea respectively. Both teams went on to reach the finals of the corresponding competitions, with Chelsea going on to win the 2009 FA Cup Final.

Off the pitch, there were a series of personnel changes through the course of the season. Chairman Graham Simpson and chief executive Mark Ashton resigned, and were replaced by Jimmy Russo and Julian Winter respectively. Following a decline in form throughout 2008, manager Aidy Boothroyd left the club by mutual consent, and was replaced by Brendan Rodgers. In turn, Rodgers controversially left the club a few weeks after the last game of the season, having previously suggested that rumours linking him to Reading were "questioning his integrity". His replacement was first team coach and former player Malky Mackay.

The season is perhaps best remembered for the "ghost goal" incident, which occurred in a league match against Reading on 20 September 2008. Following a corner from Reading player Stephen Hunt, John Eustace kicked the ball across the line, level with the six-yard box. Initially, linesman Nigel Bannister seemed to signal for a goal kick, and players from both sides ran away from the penalty area, waiting for goalkeeper Scott Loach to take it. However, Bannister walked over to referee Stuart Attwell, and after a brief discussion, Attwell awarded Reading a goal. The match eventually finished 2–2. The match also marked Loach's debut; the "ghost goal" was the first goal he conceded in his Watford career.

== Competitions ==
Legend

Win	Draw	Loss

=== Championship ===
==== Match details ====
Championship match details
Date	Opponent	Venue	Result F–A	Scorers	Attendance	Ref.
9 August 2008	Crystal Palace	Away	0–0		15,614	
16 August 2008	Charlton Athletic	Home	1–0	Smith 28'	14,413	
23 August 2008	Nottingham Forest	Away	2–3	Smith 22', 61'	20,005	
30 August 2008	Ipswich Town	Home	2–1	Eustace 59', O'Toole 87'	16,345	
13 September 2008	Sheffield Wednesday	Away	0–2		17,066	
16 September 2008	Plymouth Argyle	Home	1–2	O'Toole 83'	13,237	
20 September 2008	Reading	Home	2–2	Smith 57', O'Toole 64'	14,761	
27 September 2008	Sheffield United	Away	1–2	O'Toole 56'	24,427	
30 September 2008	Burnley	Away	2–3	Hoskins 6', 45'	10,033	
4 October 2008	Preston North End	Home	2–1	Harley 12', Smith 21'	14,087	
18 October 2008	Southampton	Away	3–0	Priskin 10', 41', Eustace 30'	17,454	
21 October 2008	Cardiff City	Home	2–2	O'Toole 2', Hoskins 24'	13,461	
25 October 2008	Wolverhampton Wanderers	Home	2–3	Rasiak 21', O'Toole 47'	16,386	
28 October 2008	Preston North End	Away	0–2		11,234	
1 November 2008	Blackpool	Home	3–4	Hoskins 4', Rasiak 36', Smith 68' pen.	13,517	
9 November 2008	Swansea City	Away	1–3	L. Williamson 33'	13,891	
15 November 2008	Barnsley	Away	1–2	Smith 52'	11,285	
22 November 2008	Queens Park Rangers	Home	3–0	Smith 26' pen., Ward 34', Williamson 45'	16,201	
25 November 2008	Bristol City	Away	1–1	Smith 72'	15,551	
29 November 2008	Doncaster Rovers	Home	1–1	Smith 31'	14,008	
6 December 2008	Birmingham City	Away	2–3	Priskin 7', Jenkins 89'	18,174	
10 December 2008	Norwich City	Home	2–1	Priskin 16', Smith 64'	13,268	
13 December 2008	Coventry City	Home	2–1	Smith 62' pen., O'Toole 72'	14,075	
20 December 2008	Derby County	Away	0–1		27,833	
26 December 2008	Bristol City	Home	2–4	Rasiak 49', Elliott 65 o.g.	15,527	
28 December 2008	Queens Park Rangers	Away	0–0		16,196	
9 January 2009	Reading	Away	0–4		18,072	
17 January 2009	Sheffield United	Home	0–2		14,555	
27 January 2009	Burnley	Home	3–0	McAnuff 2', Priskin 78', 90'	13,193	
31 January 2009	Wolverhampton Wanderers	Away	1–3	Mariappa 81'	23,571	
17 February 2009	Swansea City	Home	2–0	Priskin 23', Smith 33'	13,727	
21 February 2009	Blackpool	Away	2–0	M. Williamson 54, Priskin 85	7,451	
28 February 2009	Crystal Palace	Home	2–0	Cowie 22', Jose Fonte 72' o.g.	15,529	
3 March 2009	Plymouth Argyle	Away	1–2	Smith 59'	9,529	
7 March 2009	Charlton Athletic	Away	3–2	Cowie 17', Rasiak 56', Priskin 83'	20,052	
10 March 2009	Nottingham Forest	Home	2–1	Rasiak 5', Priskin 43'	14,730	
14 March 2009	Sheffield Wednesday	Home	2–2	Beevers 45' o.g., McAnuff 56'	16,294	
18 March 2009	Cardiff City	Away	1–2	Smith 10' pen	17,899	
21 March 2009	Ipswich Town	Away	0–0		21,434	
4 April 2009	Doncaster Rovers	Away	2–1	Hird 13' o.g., Cowie 18'	12,126	
7 April 2009	Southampton	Home	2–2	Cauna 21', Priskin 66'	16,066	
11 April 2009	Barnsley	Home	1–1	Smith 88'	16,052	
13 April 2009	Norwich City	Away	0–2		25,487	
18 April 2009	Birmingham City	Home	0–1		16,180	
25 April 2009	Coventry City	Away	3–2	Smith 58', Rasiak 61', Priskin 74'	17,195	
3 May 2009	Derby County	Home	3–1	McAnuff 14', Rasiak 28', 41'	16,131	

==== Results summary ====
Overall								Home						Away					
Pld	W	D	L	GF	GA	GD	Pts	W	D	L	GF	GA	GD	W	D	L	GF	GA	GD
46	16	10	20	68	72	−4	58	11	6	6	42	32	+10	5	4	14	26	40	−14

Last updated: 17 March 2013.
Source: Fussballdaten.de

==== Final league table ====
Pos	Team	Pld	W	D	L	GF	GA	GD	Pts
11	Queens Park Rangers	46	15	16	15	42	44	−2	61
12	Sheffield Wednesday	46	16	13	17	51	58	−7	61
13	Watford	46	16	10	20	68	72	−4	58
14	Doncaster Rovers	46	17	7	22	42	53	−11	58
15	Crystal Palace	46	15	12	19	52	55	−3	56 (Note: Crystal Palace were give a one-point deduction for using an ineligible player during a match against Sheffield United on 3 May 2009.)

Updated to match(es) played on 3 May 2009. Source: The Football League
Rules for classification: 1) points; 2) goal difference; 3) number of goals scored.

=== FA Cup ===
FA Cup match details
Round	Date	Opponent	Venue	Result F–A	Watford scorers	Opposition scorers	Attendance	Ref.
Third round	3 January 2009	Scunthorpe United	Home	1–0	Rasiak 67'	—	8,690	
Fourth round	24 January 2009	Crystal Palace	Home	4–3	DeMerit 17', Cork 27', Hoskins 67', Rasiak 70'	Hill 48', Ifill 83', 90'	10,006	
Fifth round	14 February 2009	Chelsea	Home	1–3	Priskin 69'	Anelka 75', 77', 90'	16,851	

=== League Cup ===
League Cup match details
Round	Date	Opponent	Venue	Result F–A	Watford scorers	Opposition scorers	Attendance	Ref.
First round	12 August 2008	Bristol Rovers	Home	1–0	Hoskins 88'	—	5,574	
Second round	28 August 2008	Darlington	Home	2–1 (a.e.t.)	Francis 37', O'Toole 116'	Blundell 90'	5,236	
Third round	23 September 2008	West Ham United	Home	1–0	Mullins 70' o.g.	—	12,914	
Fourth round	11 November 2008	Swansea City	Away	1–0	Williamson 21'	—	9,549	
Fifth round	3 December 2008	Tottenham Hotspur	Home	1–2	Priskin 13'	Pavlyuchenko 45' pen., Bent 76'	16,501	

== Player information ==
=== First-team squad ===
Squad at end of season

Note: Flags indicate national team as defined under FIFA eligibility rules; some limited exceptions apply. Players may hold more than one non-FIFA nationality.

No.	Pos.	Nation	Player
1	GK	EST	Mart Poom
2	DF	ENG	Gavin Hoyte (on loan from Arsenal)
3	DF	ENG	Mat Sadler
4	MF	ENG	Jack Cork (on loan from Chelsea)
6	DF	USA	Jay DeMerit
7	MF	SCO	Don Cowie
8	MF	ENG	John Eustace
9	FW	HUN	Tamás Priskin
10	FW	POL	Grzegorz Rasiak (on loan from Southampton)
11	MF	JAM	Jobi McAnuff
12	DF	ENG	Lloyd Doyley
13	GK	ENG	Scott Loach
14	MF	JAM	Lee Williamson
15	DF	ENG	Jon Harley
16	GK	ENG	Richard Lee
17	GK	ENG	Stuart Searle
18	FW	ENG	Theo Robinson
19	FW	ENG	Steve Kabba
20	MF	SLE	Al Bangura

No.	Pos.	Nation	Player
21	FW	ENG	Tommy Smith
22	FW	ENG	Will Hoskins
23	DF	ENG	Adrian Mariappa
24	DF	ENG	Mike Williamson
25	MF	SCO	Gareth Williams
26	MF	IRL	John-Joe O'Toole
27	MF	ENG	Billy Gibson
28	MF	LAT	Aleksandrs Cauņa (on loan from Skonto)
30	GK	WAL	Jonathan North
31	DF	ENG	Jordan Parkes
32	MF	ENG	Lewis Young
33	FW	ENG	Liam Henderson
35	MF	ENG	Ross Jenkins
36	DF	ENG	Eddie Oshodi
37	FW	ENG	Marvin Sordell
38	DF	ENG	Rob Kiernan
39	DF	ENG	Danny Rose (on loan from Tottenham Hotspur)
40	DF	EST	Andrei Stepanov
41	DF	NIR	Lee Hodson

==== Left club during season ====
Note: Flags indicate national team as defined under FIFA eligibility rules; some limited exceptions apply. Players may hold more than one non-FIFA nationality.

No.	Pos.	Nation	Player
4	DF	NGR	Sam Sodje (on loan from Reading)
5	DF	ENG	Leigh Bromby (on loan to Sheffield United)
7	MF	JAM	Damien Francis (retired)
7	MF	ENG	Liam Bridcutt (on loan from Chelsea)
19	FW	ENG	Lionel Ainsworth (to Huddersfield Town)

No.	Pos.	Nation	Player
24	DF	ENG	Darren Ward (on loan from Wolves)
28	FW	ENG	Moses Ashikodi (to Shrewsbury Town)
29	DF	FRA	Cédric Avinel (on loan to Gueugnon)
30	GK	ENG	Mark Tyler (on loan from Peterborough United)
34	DF	ENG	Dale Bennett (on loan to Kettering Town)

=== Transfers ===
==== In ====
Date	Nationality	Position	Name	Club From	Fee	Reference
18 July 2008	ENG	DF	Jon Harley	Burnley	Free	
26 January 2009	ENG	DF	Mike Williamson	Wycombe Wanderers	Undisclosed	
2 February 2009	SCO	MF	Don Cowie	Inverness CT	Nominal	

==== Out ====
Date	Nationality	Position	Name	Club To	Fee	Reference
30 May 2008	ENG	MF	Jordan Stewart	Derby County	Free	
8 July 2008	FRA	MF	Toumani Diagouraga	Hereford United	Undiclosed	
22 July 2008	ENG	FW	Darius Henderson	Sheffield United	£2,000,000	
6 August 2008	NGA	DF	Danny Shittu	Bolton Wanderers	Undisclosed	
23 January 2009	ENG	FW	Lionel Ainsworth	Huddersfield Town	Undisclosed	
27 February 2009	ENG	FW	Moses Ashikodi	Shrewsbury Town	Free	

==== Loan In ====
Date	Nationality	Position	Name	Club From	Length	Reference
15 August 2008	POL	FW	Grzegorz Rasiak	Southampton	Full-Season	
26 September 2008	NGA	DF	Sam Sodje	Reading	One Month (Note: This loan was cut short after just 1 game)	
30 September 2008	ENG	GK	Mark Tyler	Peterborough United	One Month (Note: Loan was extended for another month on 29 October 2008)	
30 September 2008	ENG	DF	Darren Ward	Wolverhampton Wanderers	One Month (Note: Loan was extended for another month on 29 October 2008)	
27 November 2008	ENG	MF	Liam Bridcutt	Chelsea	One Month	
31 December 2008	ENG	DF	Gavin Hoyte	Arsenal	Until end of season	
2 January 2009	ENG	MF	Jack Cork	Chelsea	Until end of season	
2 February 2009	LAT	MF	Aleksandrs Cauņa	Skonto FC	Until end of season	
24 March 2009	ENG	DF	Danny Rose	Tottenham Hotspur	Until end of season	

==== Loan Out ====
Date	Nationality	Position	Name	Club To	Length	Reference
30 May 2008	ENG	FW	Nathan Ellington	Derby County	Full-Season	
5 August 2008	ENG	FW	Moses Ashikodi	Hereford United	Until January	
21 November 2008	ENG	FW	Lionel Ainsworth	Hereford United	One Month	
12 January 2009	ENG	DF	Leigh Bromby	Sheffield United	Until end of season	
23 January 2009	FRA	DF	Cédric Avinel	FC Gueugnon	Until end of season	

=== Squad, appearances and goals ===
No.	Pos	Nat	Player	Total		Championship		FA Cup		League Cup	
No.	Pos	Nat	Player	Apps	Goals	Apps	Goals	Apps	Goals	Apps	Goals
Goalkeepers
1	GK	(Estonia) EST	Mart Poom	7	0	7	0	0	0	0	0
14	GK	(England) ENG	Scott Loach	38	0	31	0	3	0	4	0
16	GK	(England) ENG	Richard Lee	11	0	10	0	1	0	0	0
Defenders
2	DF	(England) ENG	Gavin Hoyte	10	0	7	0	3	0	0	0
3	DF	(England) ENG	Mat Sadler	16	0	15	0	1	0	0	0
6	DF	(United States) USA	Jay DeMerit	38	1	32	0	3	1	3	0
12	DF	(England) ENG	Lloyd Doyley	43	0	37	0	2	0	4	0
15	DF	(England) ENG	Jon Harley	43	1	37	1	2	0	4	0
23	DF	(England) ENG	Adrian Mariappa	47	1	39	1	3	0	5	0
24	DF	(England) ENG	Mike Williamson	17	1	17	1	0	0	0	0
Midfielders
4	MF	(England) ENG	Jack Cork	21	1	19	0	2	1	0	0
7	MF	(Scotland) SCO	Don Cowie	11	3	10	3	1	0	0	0
11	MF	(Jamaica) JAM	Jobi McAnuff	45	3	40	3	3	0	2	0
14	MF	(Jamaica) JAM	Lee Williamson	38	3	34	2	1	0	3	1
Forwards
9	FW	(Hungary) HUN	Tamas Priskin	41	14	36	12	2	1	3	1
21	FW	(England) ENG	Tommy Smith	49	17	44	17	2	0	3	0
