= Lee Hodson =

Footballer (born 1991)

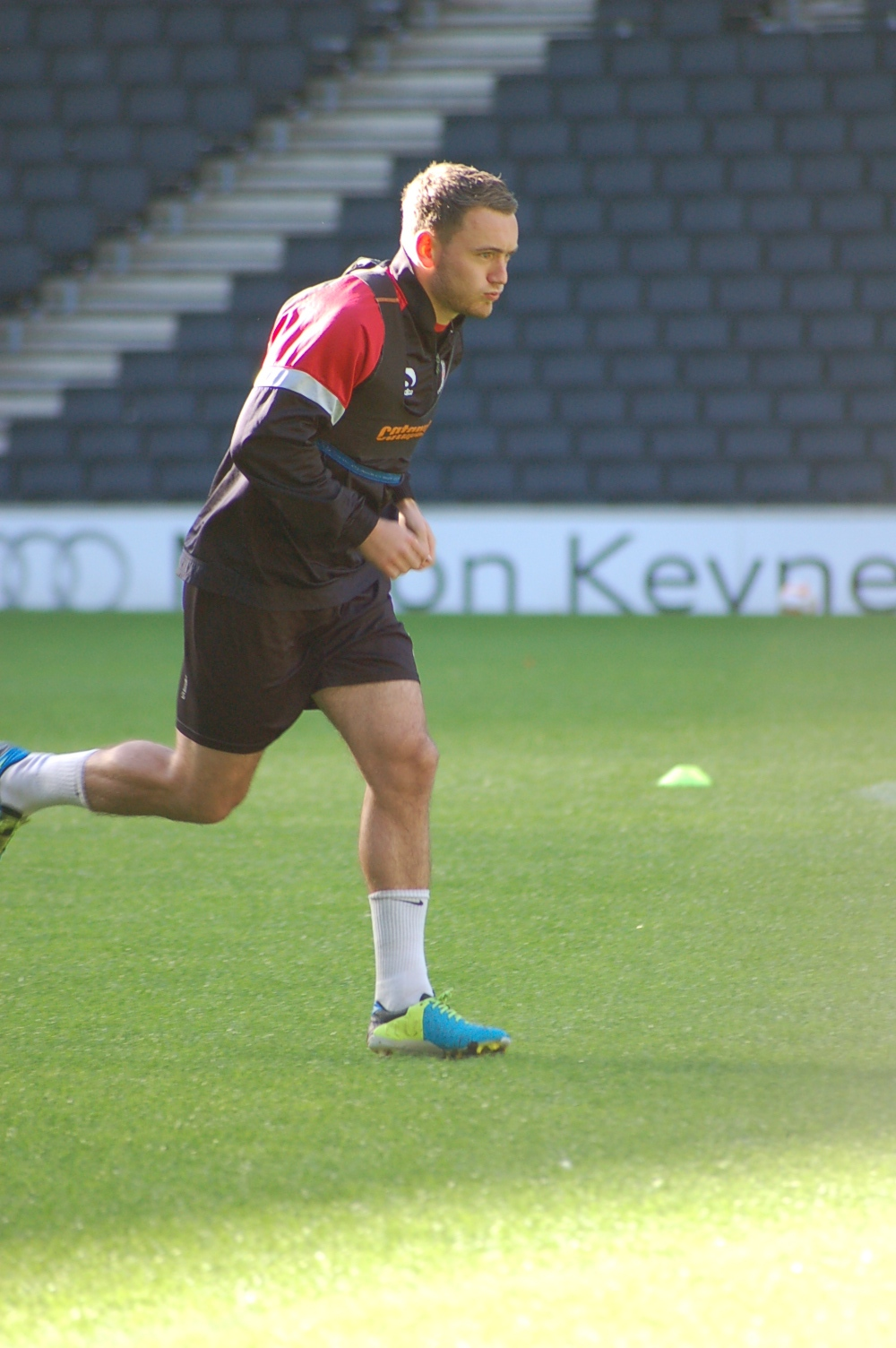
- Hodson in training for Milton Keynes Dons

Personal information
- Full name: Lee James Stephen Hodson
- Date of birth: 2 October 1991 (age 35)
- Place of birth: Borehamwood, England
- Height: 5 ft 11 in (1.80 m)
- Positions: Right-back; central midfielder

Youth career
- 1999–2004: Boreham Wood
- 2004–2009: Watford

Senior career*
Years	Team	Apps	(Gls)
2009–2013	Watford	83	(1)
2012–2013	→ Brentford (loan)	13	(0)
2013–2016	Milton Keynes Dons	40	(2)
2016	→ Kilmarnock (loan)	14	(0)
2016–2019	Rangers	17	(1)
2018–2019	→ St Mirren (loan)		(0)
2019–2021	Gillingham	7	(0)
2020	→ St Mirren (loan)	7	(0)
2020–2021	→ Hamilton Academical (loan)	33	(1)
2021–2023	Kilmarnock	0	(0)
2022–2023	→ Partick Thistle (loan)	23	(1)
2023–2025	Eastleigh	62	(0)
2025–2026	AFC Totton	15	(0)
2026	→ Dorchester Town (loan)	0	(0)

International career^{‡}
2008–2009	Northern Ireland U19	5	(0)
2009–2012	Northern Ireland U21	10	(0)
2010–	Northern Ireland	24	(0)
- * Club domestic league appearances and goals as of 07:21, 21 October 2026 (UTC) ‡ National team caps and goals as of 17:05, 3 September 2021 (UTC)

Lee James Stephen Hodson (born 2 October 1991) is a professional footballer..

Hodson is a defender, and plays primarily as a right-back, but has had spells at left back, wingback and central midfield during his career. He made his first team debut for Watford in May 2009 against Derby County, before playing in the majority of Watford's games in the 2009–10 season, during which he earned a three-year professional contract.

Hodson was born in England and was eligible to play for Northern Ireland through his grandmother. He has represented the latter country at youth, under-19 and under-21 levels, and in November 2010 was called up to the senior Northern Ireland team for the first time.

== Early life ==
Hodson was born in Hertfordshire, and grew up in Borehamwood, near Watford. He was involved with "Borehamwood 2000", a football scheme run by Boreham Wood, before joining Watford's youth system. Hodson progressed through the academy, playing 26 times for the under-18 side in 2007–08 despite still being a schoolboy. He also started nine times for the club's reserve team. Hodson signed for the club as an academy scholar in June 2008, and continued to play for the club's reserve and under-18 teams in the 2008–09 season.

== Club career ==
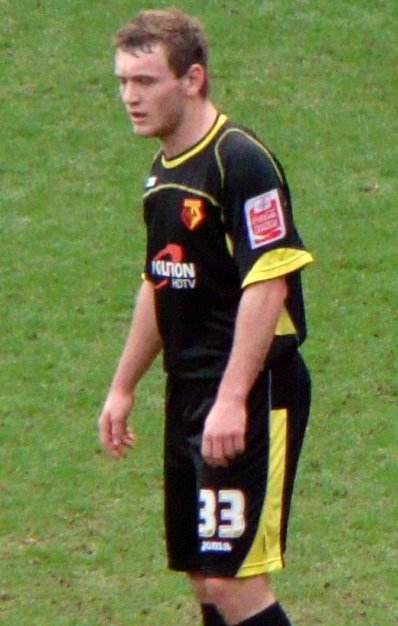
Hodson as a player of Watford

=== Watford and Brentford loan ===
Hodson was named on Watford's substitute bench for the first time on 3 May 2009, in a home game against Derby County. He was brought in the 65th minute, as a substitute for Arsenal loanee Gavin Hoyte. The match finished as a 3–1 Watford win.

Following two separate injuries to club captain Jay DeMerit early in the 2009–10 season, Adrian Mariappa moved to central defence, and Hodson started to play regularly in the Championship at right back. Hodson played in every Watford first team game in September and October 2009, and by November he had earned himself a three-year professional contract with the club. He went on to play 34 first-team matches that season—31 in the Championship—and picked up 2 yellow cards. Although primarily used at right-back, he deputised at left-back when Lloyd Doyley sustained an injury towards the end of the season. Hodson was named the Championship's Apprentice of the Month for November 2009, and was nominated for the division's Apprentice of the Year award; the other nominees were Adam Matthews and Nathan Modest. Matthews, an under-21 international for Wales, eventually won the award.

At the start of the 2010–11 season, Hodson retained his place in the first team, playing in all of Watford's first eight league fixtures. However, following the arrival of left-back Andrew Taylor on loan from Middlesbrough, Hodson faced competition from Doyley for his place at right-back. After period out of the team, Hodson returned to Watford's starting line-up early in 2011, following Taylor's return to Middlesbrough. He scored his first ever senior goal against Leeds United in the Championship on 16 April 2011.

Following the arrival of left back Carl Dickinson, Hodson faced competition at right back from Doyley in the 2011–12 season. Hodson did not make his first start until 29 October. He featured regularly in subsequent months; by 3 March 2012 Hodson had made 20 league starts, although that date marked his last appearance in the 2011–12 season.

On 22 November 2012, Hodson joined Brentford on loan until early January. Hodson extended his loan with Brentford on 8 January 2013 until the end of the 2012–13 season.

=== Milton Keynes Dons and Kilmarnock loans ===
On 20 July 2013, Hodson joined Milton Keynes Dons on a one-year contract, with the option of another year. On 29 May 2015, Hodson signed a new two-year contract.

On 1 February 2016, Hodson signed for Scottish Premiership club Kilmarnock on loan until the end of the 2015–16 season.

=== Rangers and St Mirren loans ===
On 29 June 2016, Hodson joined Scottish Premiership side Rangers on a three-year deal for an undisclosed fee. He made his debut for the club in a League Cup match against Annan Athletic on 19 July 2016. On 3 December 2016, he scored his first goal for the club, against Aberdeen, in a 2–1 victory at Ibrox Stadium.

On 20 August 2018, Hodson joined Scottish Premiership side St Mirren on loan on a season-long loan deal.

=== Gillingham and subsequent loans ===
On 8 June 2019, Hodson joined League One side Gillingham on a two-year contract. After limited appearances for Gillingham, Hodson rejoined St Mirren on loan in January 2020, until the end of the season. He signed on loan for Hamilton Academical on 10 August 2020. He scored his first goal for Hamilton in a 3–0 win over Motherwell on 2 January 2021.

=== Return to Kilmarnock ===
On 3 September 2021, Hodson signed a one-year deal with Kilmarnock, who had been relegated into the Scottish Championship at the end of 2020–21 season.

==== Partick Thistle (loan) ====
In August 2022, he joined Partick Thistle on loan until January 2023. Hodson scored his first goal for Thistle in a 4–2 away defeat to Ayr United. In January 2023, Hodson's loan at Thistle was extended until the end of the 2022–23 season.

Hodson departed Kilmarnock at the end of the 2022–23 season.

=== Eastleigh ===
On 30 June 2023, Hodson signed for National League club Eastleigh.

He departed the club at the end of the 2024–25 season.

=== AFC Totton ===
On 14 June 2025, Hodson joined newly promoted National League South side AFC Totton.

== International career ==
Hodson, who was born and raised in England, is eligible to play for Northern Ireland as his paternal grandmother was born in the country's capital, Belfast. Having represented Northern Ireland at youth and under-19 levels, Hodson moved up to the under-21 team aged 17 in 2009. He played his first games at that level in a side captained by Hodson's former Watford teammate Craig Cathcart. In March 2010 Northern Ireland under-21 manager Steve Beaglehole claimed that the English FA had approached Hodson with a view to him switching his allegiance to England.

Hodson remained with Northern Ireland, and made his debut call up to the senior squad in November 2010, for a friendly against Morocco. He was subsequently selected for the match. Later that season, Hodson played all of Northern Ireland's matches in the Nations Cup. In 2011–12, Hodson played his first games in the UEFA European Football Championships, in Northern Ireland's qualifiers against Estonia and Italy. He was named in the Northern Ireland squad for the EURO 2016 when his squad made it out of the group stage, Northern Ireland's best performance in the UEFA European Championship. Hodson however, did not make a tournament appearance.

== Career statistics ==
=== Club ===
As of end of 2024–25 season

Appearances and goals by club, season and competition
Club	Season	League			National Cup		League Cup		Other		Total	
Club	Season	Division	Apps	Goals	Apps	Goals	Apps	Goals	Apps	Goals	Apps	Goals
Watford	2008–09	Championship	1	0	0	0	0	0	—		1	0
Watford	2009–10	Championship	31	0	1	0	2	0	—		34	0
Watford	2010–11	Championship	29	1	1	0	1	0	—		31	1
Watford	2011–12	Championship	20	0	1	0	0	0	—		21	0
Watford	2012–13	Championship	2	0	0	0	2	0	0	0	4	0
Watford	Total		83	1	3	0	5	0	0	0	91	1
Brentford (loan)	2012–13	League One	13	0	3	0	0	0	2 (Note: One appearance in League One play-offs, one in Football League Trophy)	0	18	0
Milton Keynes Dons	2013–14	League One	23	1	4	0	1	0	0	0	28	1
Milton Keynes Dons	2014–15	League One	14	1	0	0	1	0	0	0	15	1
Milton Keynes Dons	2015–16	Championship	3	0	2	0	3	0	—		8	0
Milton Keynes Dons	Total		40	2	6	0	5	0	0	0	51	2
Kilmarnock (loan)	2015–16	Scottish Premiership	13	0	2	0	0	0	2 (Note: Appearances in Scottish Premiership play-offs)	0	17	0
Rangers	2016–17	Scottish Premiership	11	1	2	0	5	0	—		18	1
Rangers	2017–18	Scottish Premiership	6	0	1	0	2	0	0	0	9	0
Rangers	Total		17	1	3	0	7	0	0	0	27	1
St Mirren (loan)	2018–19	Scottish Premiership	20	0	1	0	0	0	2	0	23	0
Gillingham	2019–20	League One	7	0	1	0	1	0	3 (Note: Three appearances in the Football League Trophy)	0	12	0
Gillingham	2020–21	League One	0	0	0	0	0	0	0	0	0	0
Gillingham	Total		7	0	1	0	1	0	3	0	12	0
St Mirren (loan)	2019–20	Scottish Premiership	7	0	3	0	0	0	—		10	0
Hamilton Academical (loan)	2020–21	Scottish Premiership	33	1	1	0	2	0	—		36	1
Kilmarnock	2021–22	Scottish Championship	18	0	1	0	0	0	2 (Note: Appearance(s) in Scottish Challenge Cup)	0	21	0
Kilmarnock	2022–23	Scottish Premiership	0	0	0	0	4	0	0	0	4	0
Kilmarnock	Total		18	0	1	0	4	0	2	0	25	0
Partick Thistle (loan)	2022–23	Scottish Championship	23	1	3	0	1	0	3 (Note: One appearance in Scottish Challenge Cup, two appearances in Scottish Championship play-offs)	0	30	1
Eastleigh	2023–24	National League	32	0	3	0	—		1 (Note: Appearance(s) in FA Trophy)	0	36	0
Eastleigh	2024–25	National League	30	0	0	0	—		2	0	32	0
Eastleigh	Total		62	0	3	0	0	0	3	0	68	0
Career total			336	6	30	0	25	0	17	0	408	6

=== International ===
As of match played 3 June 2018

Appearances and goals by national team and year
National team	Year	Apps	Goals
Northern Ireland	2010	1	0
Northern Ireland	2011	5	0
Northern Ireland	2012	3	0
Northern Ireland	2013	5	0
Northern Ireland	2015	1	0
Northern Ireland	2016	4	0
Northern Ireland	2017	3	0
Northern Ireland	2018	2	0
Total		24	0

== Honours ==
Milton Keynes Dons

- Football League One runner-up: 2014–15

Kilmarnock

- Scottish Championship 2021–22
