= Adrian Mariappa =

Footballer (born 1986)

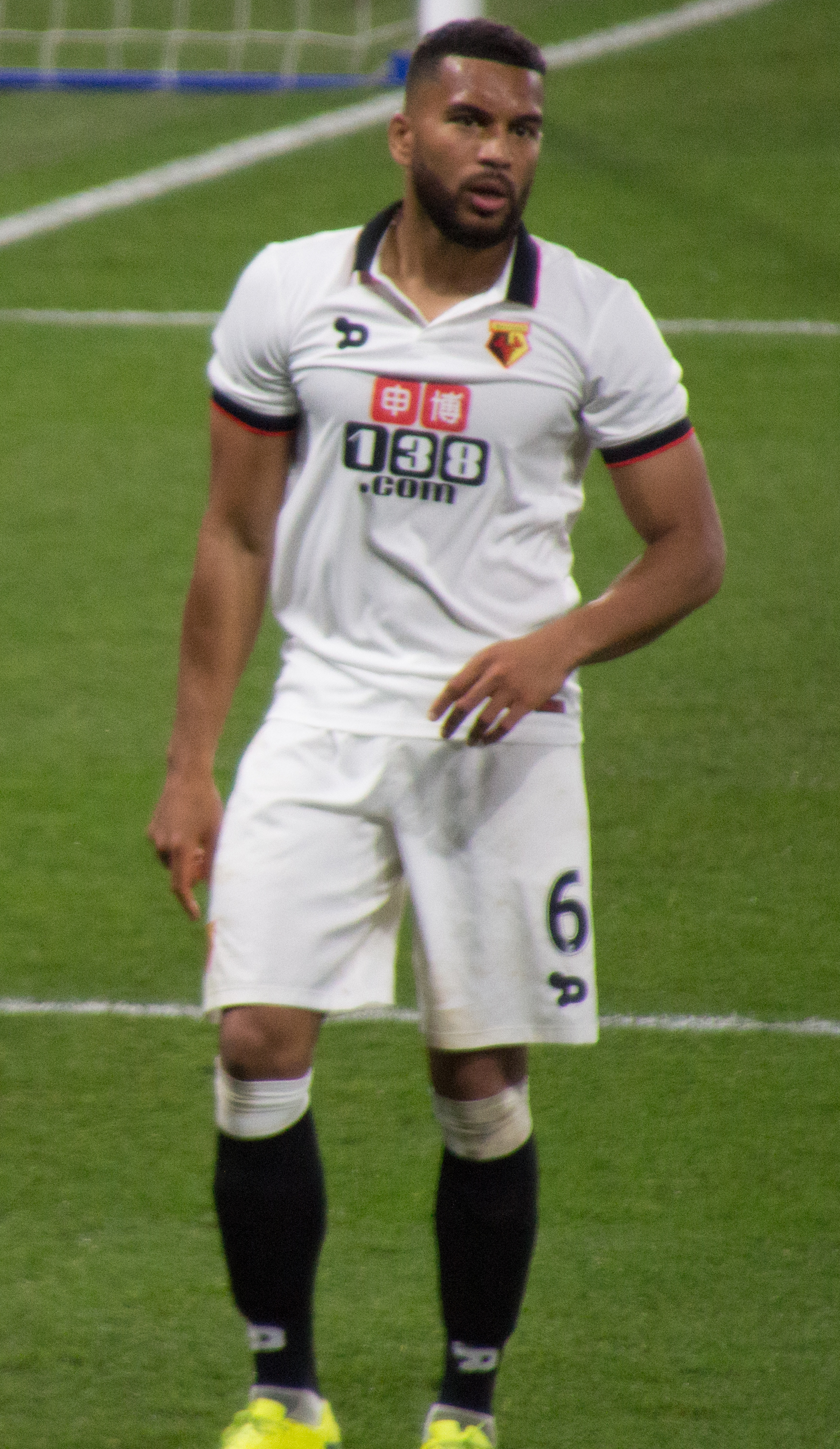
- Mariappa playing for Watford in 2017

Personal information
- Full name: Adrian Joseph Mariappa
- Date of birth: 3 October 1986 (age 40)
- Place of birth: Harrow, London, England
- Height: 6 ft 0 in (1.83 m)
- Position: Defender

Team information
- Current team: Wythenshawe

Youth career
- –2005: Watford

Senior career*
Years	Team	Apps	(Gls)
2005–2012	Watford	216	(4)
2012–2013	Reading	29	(1)
2013–2016	Crystal Palace	39	(1)
2016–2020	Watford	81	(0)
2020–2021	Bristol City	25	(0)
2021–2022	Macarthur FC	19	(3)
2022–2023	Burton Albion	8	(1)
2023–2024	Salford City	39	(0)
2024–2025	Wealdstone	41	(0)
2025–2026	St Albans City	9	(0)
2026–	Wythenshawe	0	(0)

International career^{‡}
2012–2023	Jamaica	73	(1)
Medal record
Men's football
Representing Jamaica
CONCACAF Gold Cup
Runner-up	2015 United States–Canada	Team
- * Club domestic league appearances and goals as of 3 July 2026 (UTC) ‡ National team caps and goals as of 1 July 2024

Adrian Joseph Mariappa (born 3 October 1986) is a professional footballer who plays as a defender for Wythenshawe. Born in England, he represents the Jamaica national team. He is also currently assistant coach at Watford under-21s.

He progressed through Watford's youth academy and started playing for the first team in the 2005–06 season. Although primarily a centre-back, he spent some of his early professional career at right back due to competition for places in the middle. In his first spell at Watford, he made 248 first-team appearances, including 19 in the Premier League. This included a run of 114 consecutive league appearances, the fourth-longest streak in Watford's history. Mariappa captained Watford at under-18, reserve and first-team levels, and was the club's vice-captain in his final few years at Vicarage Road.

Mariappa accepted his first call-up to Jamaica's international team in May 2012. He won his first cap against Guyana later that month, and transferred to Premier League side Reading in July 2012. He made 29 league appearances for the club before joining Premier League side Crystal Palace in September 2013, following Reading's relegation to the Championship. Returning to Watford before the 2016–17 season, Mariappa made seven league appearances that season.

== Club career ==
=== Watford ===
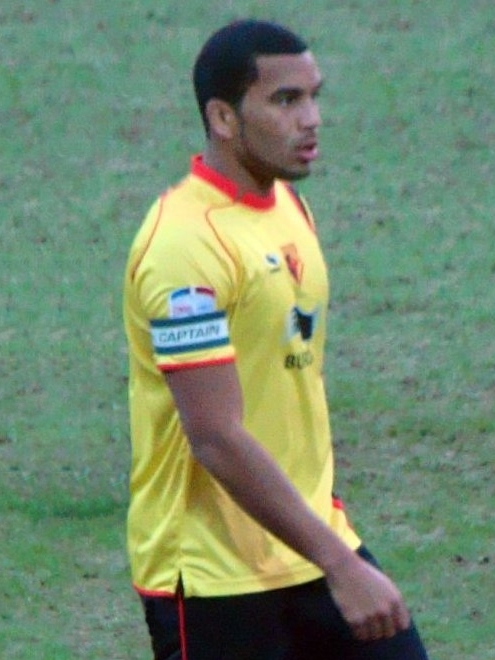
Mariappa with Watford in 2011

Born in Harrow, Mariappa joined Watford's youth system at the age of eight. At the age of 15 he was initially told he would be released by the club. While in the Watford academy Mariappa trained with athletics and basketball clubs to improve his sprinting and jumping techniques. He captained the club's under-18 side during their FA Youth Cup quarter-final against Tottenham Hotspur, and later captained the reserve team.

Mariappa was selected as an unused substitute in Watford's last league game of the 2004–05 season. After signing his first professional contract with the club that summer, Mariappa made his first team debut in a League Cup match against Notts County on 23 August 2005, playing 90 minutes in a 3–1 Watford win. He made another cup start against Wigan Athletic in the 3rd round. During the 2005–06 season he also made three league appearances, including a clean sheet in his first league start, against Hull City on the final day of the regular season. Mariappa did not play any of Watford's play-off games, but was an unused substitute in the final, in which the team won promotion to the Premier League.

Watford started their 2006–07 Premier League campaign at Everton, with Mariappa starting in central defence in place of first-team regular Jay DeMerit. He was substituted at half-time, and, aside from a League Cup appearance against Accrington Stanley, did not make another first-team appearance until December 2006, when in an away match at Newcastle United he came on for the injured James Chambers at right-back. He continued in that position, playing regularly for the rest of the season.

With Watford back in the Championship for 2007–08, Mariappa found himself largely on the substitute bench, making 13 league starts and 3 in other competitions, as Watford again reached the play-offs. By contrast, he started 45 games in all competitions in the 2008–09 season, under the management of Aidy Boothroyd, Malky Mackay and latterly Brendan Rodgers, and scored his first senior goal for Watford in a 3–1 defeat at Wolves on 31 January 2009. At the end of the season he signed a two-year extension to his contract.

In the absence of injured captain Jay DeMerit, Mariappa skippered Watford for the first time on 12 September 2009, in a 1–0 victory at Vicarage Road against Barnsley. He retained the captaincy during DeMerit's absence, and scored his second senior goal in October 2009, on his 100th professional appearance. Watford finished the 2009–10 season 16th in the Championship; Mariappa was the only player to start each of the club's games in the Football League, FA Cup and League Cup. 2010–11 followed a similar pattern to the previous campaign; Mariappa started every game for which he was available, and was one of Watford's six scorers in the team's 6–1 away win against Millwall. He was also appointed as the club's vice captain during the season. However, Mariappa was sent off for the first time in his career on 19 March 2011, in a 2–1 defeat to Middlesbrough. The resulting suspension ended Mariappa's run of 113 consecutive league appearances, the fourth highest in Watford's history.

Mariappa continued to play in the 2011–12 season under new manager Sean Dyche. He was the focus of transfer speculation during the January 2012 transfer window when Watford received a number of bids for him from Premier League clubs. Three bids from Newcastle United were rejected; an offer from Wigan Athletic was accepted, but Mariappa rejected a move. He stayed at the club until the following summer, and his good form saw players and fans vote him 2011–12 Watford Player of the Season.

=== Reading ===
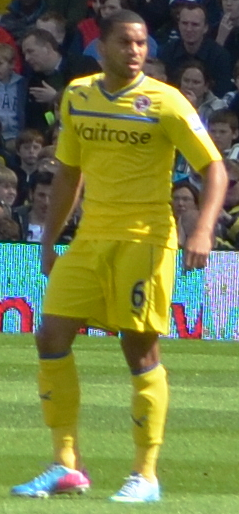
Mariappa playing for Reading in 2013.

On 17 July 2012, it was announced that Mariappa had joined Reading on a three-year deal for an undisclosed fee. Media estimates of the transfer fee ranged from £2m to £3m.

=== Crystal Palace ===
Mariappa signed for newly promoted Premier League club Crystal Palace on a three-year contract for an undisclosed fee on 2 September 2013.

At the end of his three-year deal, it was confirmed on 13 June 2016 that he would be released by Crystal Palace on expiry of his contract.

=== Return to Watford ===
On 30 August 2016, Mariappa re-joined Watford on a three-year deal after a four-year absence. He made his 250th Watford start against West Bromwich Albion in a 1–0 win on 3 March 2018, winning Man of the Match for his performance.

=== Bristol City ===
Following a defensive injury crisis, on 11 November 2020 Bristol City signed Mariappa on a short term deal. On 14 May 2021 he was released by the club at the end of his contract.

=== Macarthur FC ===
On 29 November 2021, A-League Men side Macarthur FC announced that they had signed Mariappa. He made his debut against Western Sydney Wanderers on 11 December 2021 in a 0-2 win as the first Jamaican player to play in the Australian national league.

=== Burton Albion ===
On 7 October 2022, he returned to England to sign a short term deal with League One side Burton Albion.

On 18 January 2023, Mariappa left the club after his short-term deal expired.

=== Salford City ===
On 23 March 2023, Mariappa signed for EFL League Two club Salford City on a short-term contract until the end of the season. On 10 July 2023, Mariappa signed a new one-year contract. On 21 May 2024, the club announced he would be released when the contract expired.

=== Wealdstone ===
On 27 June 2024, Mariappa agreed to sign for National League side Wealdstone, where he was appointed as captain. On 23 June 2025, it was announced that Mariappa had left the club.

=== St Albans City ===
On 30 October 2025, he signed for Isthmian League Premier Division club St Albans City.

== International career ==
Mariappa is eligible for the Fiji national team through his Fijian father. In late 2010 he was named by the Fiji Football Association in the 50-member national training squad to prepare for the 2011 Pacific Games in New Caledonia, but did not take up the place.

Both of Mariappa's maternal grandparents are from Jamaica. In 2012 he accepted a call up to the Jamaica squad, for a friendly against Guyana. His first match in an international competition came on 9 June 2012, in a 2–1 World Cup qualifying win against Guatemala.

== Coaching career ==
In August 2025, Mariappa returned to former club Watford in the role of under-21 assistant coach.

== Personal life ==
Mariappa is of Fijian (paternal) and Jamaican (maternal) descent. As of March 2019, Mariappa had been a vegan.

In September 2025, he graduated with a diploma in sporting directorship through the Professional Footballers' Association business school, graduating alongside Tim Krul and Luke Matheson.

== Career statistics ==
=== Club ===
As of match played 25 April 2026

Appearances and goals by club, season and competition
Club	Season	League			FA Cup		League Cup		Other		Total	
Club	Season	Division	Apps	Goals	Apps	Goals	Apps	Goals	Apps	Goals	Apps	Goals
Watford	2005–06	Championship	3	0	0	0	2	0	0	0	5	0
Watford	2006–07	Premier League	19	0	5	0	1	0	—		25	0
Watford	2007–08	Championship	25	0	2	0	2	0	1 (Note: Appearance in Championship play-offs)	0	30	0
Watford	2008–09	Championship	39	1	3	0	5	0	—		47	1
Watford	2009–10	Championship	46	1	1	0	2	0	—		49	1
Watford	2010–11	Championship	45	1	2	0	2	0	—		49	1
Watford	2011–12	Championship	39	1	2	0	1	0	—		42	1
Watford	Total		216	4	15	0	15	0	1	0	247	4
Reading	2012–13	Premier League	29	1	2	0	1	0	—		32	1
Reading	2013–14	Championship	0	0	—		1	0	—		1	0
Reading	Total		29	1	2	0	2	0	—		33	1
Crystal Palace	2013–14	Premier League	24	1	2	0	—		—		26	1
Crystal Palace	2014–15	Premier League	12	0	2	0	2	0	—		16	0
Crystal Palace	2015–16	Premier League	3	0	1	0	3	0	—		7	0
Crystal Palace	Total		39	1	5	0	5	0	—		49	1
Watford	2016–17	Premier League	7	0	1	0	0	0	—		8	0
Watford	2017–18	Premier League	28	0	1	0	1	1	—		30	1
Watford	2018–19	Premier League	26	0	4	0	2	0	—		32	0
Watford	2019–20	Premier League	20	0	1	0	2	0	—		23	0
Watford	Total		81	0	7	0	5	1	—		93	1
Bristol City	2020–21	Championship	25	0	2	0	0	0	—		27	0
Macarthur FC	2021–22	A-League Men	19	3	0	0	—		—		19	3
Burton Albion	2022–23	League One	8	1	2	0	0	0	2 (Note: Appearance(s) in FA Trophy)	0	12	1
Salford City	2022–23	League Two	7	0	0	0	0	0	2 (Note: Appearance(s) in League Two play-offs)	0	9	0
Salford City	2023–24	League Two	32	0	1	0	3	0	2	0	38	0
Salford City	Total		39	0	1	0	3	0	4	0	47	0
Wealdstone	2024–25	National League	41	0	2	0	—		0	0	43	0
St Albans City	2025–26	Isthmian League Premier Division	9	0	1	0	—		0	0	10	0
Career total			506	10	37	0	30	1	7	0	580	11

=== International ===
As of 13 September 2023

International statistics
National team	Year	Apps	Goals
Jamaica	2012	6	0
Jamaica	2013	9	0
Jamaica	2014	4	0
Jamaica	2015	16	1
Jamaica	2016	7	0
Jamaica	2018	1	0
Jamaica	2019	6	0
Jamaica	2021	9	0
Jamaica	2022	8	0
Jamaica	2023	7	0
Total		73	1

Scores and results list Jamaica's goal tally first.

No.	Date	Venue	Opponent	Score	Result	Competition
1	4 September 2015	Independence Park, Kingston, Jamaica	Nicaragua	2–3	2–3	2018 FIFA World Cup qualification

== Honours ==
Watford

- Football League Championship play-offs: 2006
- FA Cup runner-up: 2018–19

Crystal Palace

- FA Cup runner-up: 2015–16

Jamaica

- CONCACAF Gold Cup runner-up: 2015

Individual

- Watford Player of the Season: 2011–12
- A-Leagues All Star: 2022
