= Eddie Oshodi =

English footballer (born 1992)

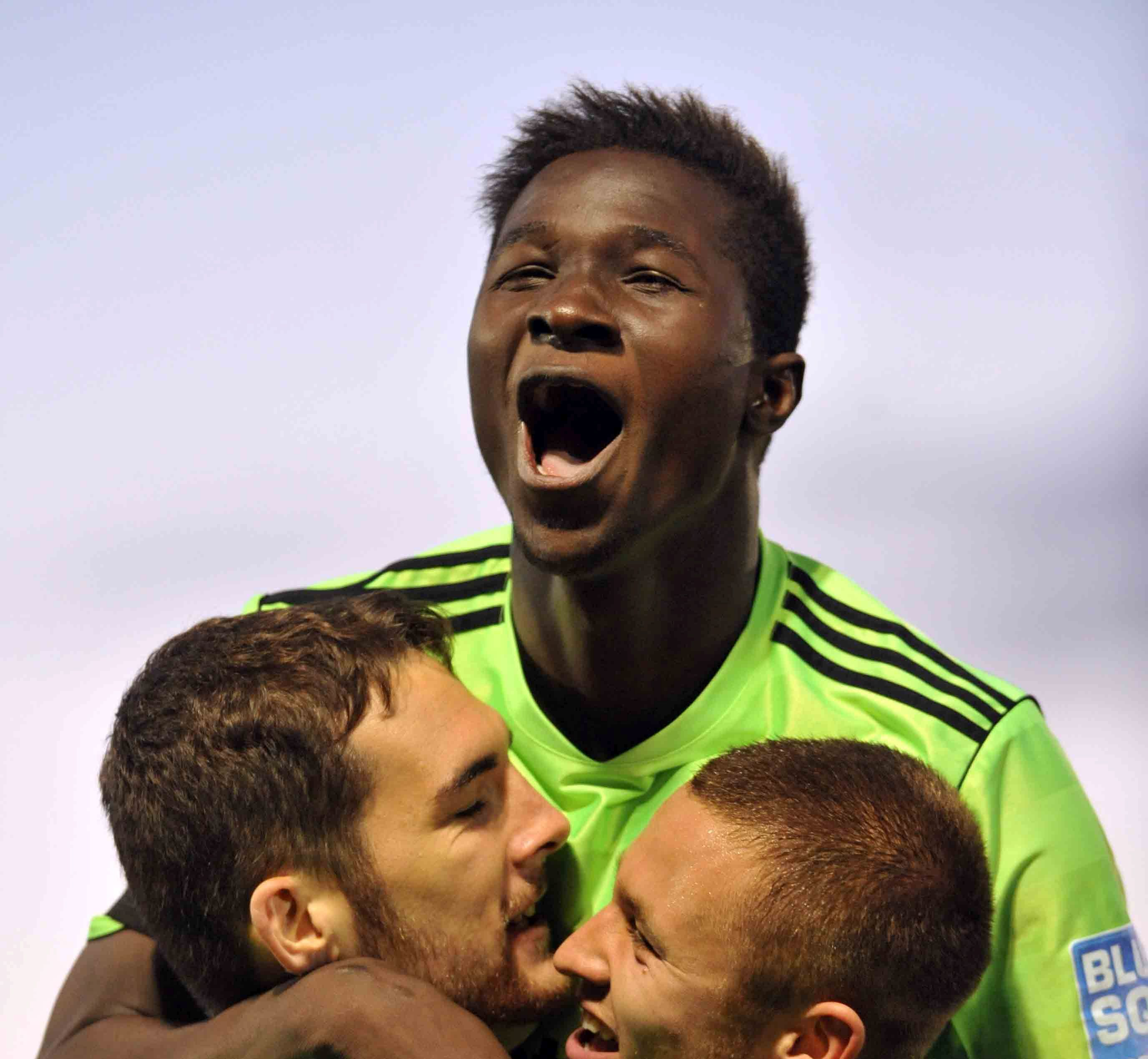
- Oshodi celebrating a goal for Forest Green Rovers in 2012

Personal information
- Full name: Edward Abdullai Mobalaji Olatunji Afo Oshodi
- Date of birth: 14 January 1992 (age 34)
- Place of birth: Brent, England
- Height: 6 ft 0 in (1.83 m)
- Position: Defender

Youth career
- –2008: Watford

Senior career*
Years	Team	Apps	(Gls)
2008–2011	Watford	1	(0)
2010–2011	→ Dagenham & Redbridge (loan)	0	(0)
2011	→ Rushden & Diamonds (loan)	12	(1)
2011–2015	Forest Green Rovers	117	(5)
2015	Hemel Hempstead Town	17	(2)
2015–2016	St Albans City	19	(5)
2016–2018	Wealdstone	52	(7)
2019–2021	Hendon	21	(2)

International career
2007–2008	England U16	3	(0)
2008–2009	England U17	12	(0)
2012–2013	England C	3	(0)
- * Club domestic league appearances and goals

Edward Abdullai Mobalaji Olatunji Afo Oshodi (born 14 January 1992) is an English semi-professional footballer who played as a defender.

He began his career at Watford in the Championship and spent time on loan at Dagenham & Redbridge and Rushden & Diamonds before moving to Forest Green Rovers in 2011.

In 2015, Oshodi announced his retirement from the game at the age of 23, but returned to playing at semi-professional level shortly thereafter, signing for Hemel Hempstead Town and then St Albans City.

He represented England U16, U17 and C at international level.

== Club career ==
=== Watford ===
Oshodi started his career with Watford's youth system. His first involvement with the first team came when he was named on the bench for a 1–0 League Cup third round win over Premier League side West Ham United on 23 September 2008. He made his first team debut for Watford during the 2009–10 season on 29 September in a 3–2 Championship home defeat against Coventry City, replacing the injured Lee Hodson as a substitute in the 78th minute. He was still an academy scholar at the time.

On 25 November 2010, Oshodi signed on loan for League One side Dagenham & Redbridge until January 2011. He joined Conference side Rushden & Diamonds on a three-month loan on 24 January 2011. He scored his first senior career goal on 22 February 2011, in a 2–0 Conference win against Eastbourne Borough. He made 12 appearances during his time with the club.

=== Forest Green Rovers ===
On 7 October 2011, Oshodi signed for Conference side Forest Green Rovers, who were managed by his former youth team coach at Watford, Dave Hockaday, on a two-year deal. He made his Forest Green debut the next day in a 0–0 away draw against Fleetwood Town.

In August 2012, Oshodi was named Forest Green captain at the age of 20 for the beginning of the 2012–13 season. He scored his first goal for the club on 4 September 2012 in a home win against Ebbsfleet United. In January 2013 he agreed a new two-and-a-half-year extension to his contract. In January 2014, he spent a week training with League One side Brentford, having played under manager Mark Warburton in the academy at Watford.

Oshodi made his hundredth league appearance for Forest Green on 8 April 2014 in a 1–1 draw with Kidderminster Harriers. His first appearance of the 2014–15 season saw him come on as a substitute on 86 minutes in a 2–0 win over FC Halifax Town on 13 September 2014. On 29 November 2014, he scored the opening goal, as well as an own goal, in a 2–1 win over Dartford.

On 2 February 2015, Oshodi revealed that he was stepping away from football to focus on his charity work and that he had come to a mutual agreement to leave Forest Green.

=== Semi-professional football ===
Oshodi signed for Conference South side Hemel Hempstead Town in March 2015. He was sent off in successive months for Hemel in October 2015, and left the club in November with manager Dean Brennan saying he needed to "balance the books". In December 2015 Oshodi signed for another National League South side, St Albans City.

=== Wealdstone FC ===
Oshodi signed for Wealdstone in the summer of 2016 and played two seasons with the club making over 50 league appearances before retiring in May 2018.

=== Hendon ===
In December 2019, Oshodi joined Hendon FC. He decided to step back from football in the summer of 2021.

== International career ==
Oshodi is eligible to play for England and Nigeria. Oshodi represented the England U16 and U17 teams and made three appearances at the 2009 European U17 Championship, as England crashed out in the group stage. In February 2012, Oshodi was called up to the England C team for a 2011–13 International Challenge Trophy match against Italy Lega Pro and played the full 90 minutes of the 1–1 draw. He then earned another call up to the England C squad in August 2012 for another 2011–13 International Challenge Trophy match against Belgium U23. Oshodi played the full 90 minutes in a 2–1 win over Belgium to earn his second cap.

== Career statistics ==
As of match played 9 December 2017

Appearances and goals by club, season and competition
Club	Season	League			FA Cup		League Cup		Other		Total	
Club	Season	Division	Apps	Goals	Apps	Goals	Apps	Goals	Apps	Goals	Apps	Goals
Watford	2009–10	Championship	1	0	0	0	0	0	—		1	0
Watford	2010–11	Championship	0	0	0	0	1	0	—		1	0
Watford	Total		1	0	0	0	1	0	—		2	0
Dagenham & Redbridge (loan)	2010–11	League One	0	0	—		—		—		0	0
Rushden & Diamonds (loan)	2010–11	Conference Premier	12	1	—		—		—		12	1
Forest Green Rovers	2011–12	Conference Premier	30	0	1	0	—		1 (Note: Appearances in FA Trophy)	0	32	0
Forest Green Rovers	2012–13	Conference Premier	41	1	3	1	—		1	0	45	2
Forest Green Rovers	2013–14	Conference Premier	34	3	0	0	—		2	0	36	3
Forest Green Rovers	2014–15	Conference Premier	12	1	2	0	—		0	0	14	1
Forest Green Rovers	Total		117	5	6	1	—		4	0	127	6
Hemel Hempstead Town	2014–15	Conference South	7	2	—		—		—		7	2
Hemel Hempstead Town	2015–16	National League South	10	0	2	0	—		—		12	0
Hemel Hempstead Town	Total		17	2	2	0	—		—		19	2
St Albans City	2015–16	National League South	19	5	—		—		—		19	5
Wealdstone	2016–17	National League South	34	4	2	0	—		14 (Note: Four appearances in the Middlesex Senior Cup; four appearances and a goal in the Middlesex Senior Charity Cup; six appearances and two goals in the FA Trophy)	3	50	7
Wealdstone	2017–18	National League South	18	3	0	0	—		0	0	18	3
Wealdstone	Total		52	7	2	0	0	0	14	3	68	10
Career total			218	20	10	1	1	0	18	3	247	24
