= Michael Bryan (footballer) =

Footballer (born 1990)

Personal information
- Full name: Michael Anthony Bryan
- Date of birth: 21 February 1990 (age 36)
- Place of birth: Hayes, England
- Height: 5 ft 10 in (1.78 m)
- Position: Winger

Team information
- Current team: Southall

Youth career
- 2000–2006: Queens Park Rangers
- 2006–2008: Hayes & Yeading
- 2008–2009: Watford

Senior career*
Years	Team	Apps	(Gls)
2009–2012	Watford	12	(0)
2011	→ Bradford City (loan)	9	(0)
2012–2013	Brackley Town	0	(0)
2012–2013	→ Daventry Town (loan)	11	(1)
2013	Corby Town	3	(0)
2013–2014	Hendon	34	(1)
2014	Hampton & Richmond Borough	4	(0)
2014–2022	Harrow Borough	245	(13)
2022–	Southall	6	(0)

International career^{‡}
- Northern Ireland U19
2009–2011	Northern Ireland U21	4	(0)
2010	Northern Ireland	2	(0)
- * Club domestic league appearances and goals as of 18:26, 29 January 2023 (UTC) ‡ National team caps and goals as of 11:59, 11 February 2012 (UTC)

Michael Anthony Bryan (born 21 February 1990) is a footballer who plays as a winger for Southall having signed for them in late 2022. Bryan previously spent eight years with Harrow Borough.

Born and raised in England, he is eligible to play for Northern Ireland through his ancestry and has been selected for the latter at under-19, under-21 and full international levels.

== Club career ==
Bryan was born and raised in West London and attended Isleworth and Syon School. He started his career as a schoolboy at Queens Park Rangers at the age of 10, being released six years later, before joining Watford.

He made his professional debut for Watford on 15 August 2009 in the Championship, in a 2–0 away defeat against Sheffield United, replacing Danny Graham as a substitute in the 89th minute. He made a further six appearances for Watford in the 2009–10 season, and his first start came in the final match; a 4–0 away win against Coventry City. He joined Bradford City on loan for five-months on 11 August 2011. On 17 January 2012, he joined Bournemouth on trial. In February 2012, he was on trial with Leyton Orient, scoring in a reserve friendly at Ipswich Town on 7 February 2012, losing 4–1. After returning from to Watford, Bryan did not secure any further loan deals or game-time at Vicarage Road, and was released in June 2012, after being deemed surplus to requirements.

On 31 July 2012, Bryan was named as an unused substitute in a friendly match for Northampton Town in a 3–4 defeat to Derby County, whilst on trial for the club. He later joined Brackley Town, then in the Southern Premier League, five divisions below Watford, but was immediately sent to Daventry Town in the division below on loan until January 2013, supplementing his football career with a part-time job. However, upon his return he was released from Brackley and joined their Conference North rivals, Corby Town, on a free transfer. On 1 July 2013, it was reported that Bryan was on trial with Portsmouth however he was released the following week. Bryan signed for Isthmian League Premier Division club Hendon in late August 2013.

Following one season with Hendon, Bryan signed for league counterparts Hampton & Richmond Borough in the summer of 2014.

After failing to regularly hold down a place at Hampton & Richmond, and after the departure of the management team who signed him, Bryan signed for league counterparts Harrow Borough in September 2014, making his debut on 23 September 2014.

Bryan has remained with Harrow since, making close to 200 league appearances and over 300 for the club in all competitions.

In December 2022, Bryan departed having made 399 appearances in all competitions for Harrow Borough, scoring 33 times in total. He joined Isthmian League side Southall.

== International career ==
Bryan was called up Northern Ireland under-19 squad in April 2009. This was followed by a call-up to the senior Northern Ireland squad for the 2010 summer friendlies. He made his debut for the senior Northern Ireland team on 26 May 2010 against Turkey in a friendly. This was followed four days later by his first start for his country in another friendly, against Chile.

== Career statistics ==
As of 3 May 2012

Appearances and goals by club, season and competition
Club	Season	League			FA Cup		League Cup		Other		Total	
Club	Season	Division	Apps	Goals	Apps	Goals	Apps	Goals	Apps	Goals	Apps	Goals
Watford	2009–10	Championship	7	0	0	0	0	0	0	0	7	0
Watford	2010–11	Championship	5	0	0	0	2	0	0	0	7	0
Watford	2011–12	Championship	0	0	0	0	0	0	0	0	0	0
Bradford City (loan)	2011–12	League Two	8	0	0	0	0	0	1 (Note: Appearance in Football League Trophy)	0	9	0
Career total			20	0	0	0	2	0	1	0	23	0
