= 2009–10 Watford F.C. season =

English football team season

Watford
2009–10 season
- Chairman: Jimmy Russo (until 15 December 2009); Graham Taylor (from 15 December 2009)
- Manager: Malky Mackay
- Stadium: Vicarage Road
- Football League Championship: 16th
- FA Cup: Third Round (eliminated by Chelsea)
- League Cup: Second Round (eliminated by Leeds United)
- Top goalscorer: League: Danny Graham (14); All: Danny Graham (14)
- Highest home attendance: 17,120 (vs Newcastle United, 27 February 2009)
- Lowest home attendance: Competitive: 12,179 (vs Bristol City, 9 February 2010); Overall: 3,598 (vs Parma, 1 August 2009)
- Average home league attendance: 14,344 (excluding friendlies)
Home colours	Away colours

Watford Football Club are an association football club from Watford, Hertfordshire, England. Home matches were played at the club's stadium, Vicarage Road, which had a capacity of 17,504 for the 2009–10 season. Watford's season officially began on 1 July 2009 and concluded on 30 June 2010, although competitive matches were only played between August and May. They competed in the Football League Championship, the second highest division in English football, following their relegation from the Premier League in 2007.

After guiding the club to a 13th-placed finish in 2008–09, Brendan Rodgers resigned as manager of Watford in June 2009 to take up the same role at Reading, with three members of his coaching staff doing likewise. He was replaced as manager by ex-Watford player and coach Malky Mackay. Early in the season, first-team players including Player of the Season Tommy Smith and Hungary international striker Tamás Priskin left the club. New arrivals included striker Danny Graham and former Scotland international midfielder Scott Severin. Among Watford's five loan signings were former Watford player Heiðar Helguson, and Tom Cleverley, who went on to become the club's Player of the Season.

Although Watford twice occupied a playoff position in late 2009, they gradually slipped down the table over the course of the season. With five games to go, they were in 21st position in the Championship, separated from the relegation zone only on goal difference. A 3–0 win over Reading secured Watford's Championship survival in their penultimate match of 2009–10. They eventually finished in 16th position out of 24 teams. In other competitions, Watford were defeated in the third round of the FA Cup by eventual winners Chelsea, and eliminated from the League Cup in the second round by Leeds United.

== Background ==
"When I am asked about other clubs, people are questioning my integrity and one thing I have mentioned is I always have integrity. I am loyal and find it disloyal when I am asked about other clubs when I am the Watford manager. There is nothing that has changed in that respect. "

— Brendan Rodgers, 22 May 2009

The 2008–09 Championship season took place between 1 July 2008 and 30 June 2009, and Watford finished the season in 13th place in the league table. Previous manager Aidy Boothroyd left the club by "mutual consent" in November 2008 and was replaced by former Reading and Chelsea academy boss Brendan Rodgers. New arrivals Jack Cork, Don Cowie and Mike Williamson contributed to Watford's improved form between February and May 2009, lifting Watford away from the relegation zone in the closing weeks of the season. The club's financial problems had been well documented and several changes to the playing staff were anticipated over the summer. In addition to anticipated player sales, another person linked with a move away from Vicarage Road was manager Rodgers, who had been linked with a move to former club Reading. He was not happy with the suggestion that he was in talks with Reading and suggested that his integrity was being questioned. When he subsequently joined Reading in June, Watford received an initial £500,000 in compensation. First-team coach and former Watford and Scotland player Malky Mackay was appointed as his successor. The only player to leave the club prior to the start of pre-season training was Lee Williamson, who had spent the second half of the 2008–09 season on loan at Preston.

== Pre-season ==
Watford started pre-season training at their training ground in London Colney on 1 July 2009. The first team began with friendly matches at local sides Boreham Wood, Hampton & Richmond and Wealdstone, before a pre-season tour to Spain where they faced CF Balaguer and UE Lleida. Meanwhile, a development side including several first-team squad members faced Tring Athletic and St Albans City. The club's final pre-season fixture was a 3–2 home victory against Italian side Parma.

Watford sold striker Tamás Priskin to Ipswich Town days before the start of the season and started the Championship campaign with the future of several players unresolved, including those of top scorer and player of the season Tommy Smith, highest earner Jobi McAnuff, and the club's most expensive ever player Nathan Ellington.

Legend

Win (W) Draw (D) Loss (L) Postponed (P–P)

All matches played in England unless otherwise stated.

11 July 2009	Boreham Wood	1–4	Watford	Meadow Park, Boreham Wood
	Okojee 66'		Bryan 3'; Graham 9' 13'; Harley 90+1'

18 July 2009	Hampton & Richmond	1–1	Watford	Beveree Stadium, Hampton, London
	Collins 30'		Young 80'

18 July 2009	Wealdstone	0–3	Watford	Grosvenor Vale, Ruislip
			Graham 18'; Priskin (pen 36); Ellington 87'

24 July 2009	CF Balaguer	1–1	Watford	Municipal, Balaguer, Spain
	Soldevila 80'		Eustace 36'

27 July 2009	UE Lleida	1–1	Watford	Camp d'Esports, Lleida, Spain
	Sellarés		Graham

1 August 2009	Watford	3–2	Parma	Vicarage Road, Watford
	Smith 34'; Graham 36'; Priskin 52'		Paci 28'; Mariga 64'

== Football League Championship ==
A total of 24 teams competed in the Football League Championship in the 2009–10 season. Each team played 46 matches; two against every other team, one match at each club's stadium. Three points were awarded for each win, one point per draw, and none for defeats. At the end of the season the top two teams would gain promotion to the Premier League. The bottom three would be relegated to Football League One. The teams that finished 3rd–6th competed in the play-offs, with the winner earning the third and final promotion place.

The provisional fixture list was released on 17 June 2009, but was subject to change in the event of clashes with other competitions, inclement weather, or matches being selected for television coverage. Watford's home games against Sheffield Wednesday and QPR were played on a Friday and Monday respectively, as a result of live television coverage. The home game against Sheffield United was postponed and rescheduled due to adverse weather conditions, while the away fixture at Blackpool was brought forward from a Tuesday to the preceding Saturday, as both clubs were eliminated from the FA Cup in the third round.

=== 2009 ===
- Watford's team for the first game of the season, a 1–1 draw at home against Doncaster Rovers.

Watford's first league match was at home to Doncaster Rovers, a team who finished the 2008–09 season level on points with Watford. Mackay was banned from the match, due to a suspension from an incident in the previous season. Watford lined up in a 4–4–2 formation, with Tommy Smith playing as a striker, and Don Cowie and Jobi McAnuff as wingers. Scott Severin was playing his first competitive match for Watford, and fellow debutant Danny Graham scored the opening goal after 27 minutes, a close range finish from a Tommy Smith cross. This was followed by a headed equaliser from Doncaster's James Hayter ten minutes later. In the second half, Doncaster striker Dean Shiels had a shot which his manager felt had crossed the line. However, the referee deemed that it had not, and the match finished as a draw. Watford were defeated 2–0 at Sheffield United in their next league fixture, with Jamie Ward and Ched Evans scoring for the opposition. The result caused Watford to slip into the relegation places for the only time of the season. Mackay expressed disappointment at his side for the goals they had conceded, and revealed that club was considering a transfer offer for Smith.

Despite the transfer speculation, Smith played for Watford at Nottingham Forest, scoring one goal and assisting two more. Also involved were Lee Hodson, who made his first competitive starting appearance, and loan players Henri Lansbury and Tom Cleverley. Forest scored twice, but Cleverley scored Watford's fourth goal to secure the club's first league win of the season. The home game against Blackpool at Vicarage Road proved to be Smith's final game for the club. His and Cleverley's goals were equalised by Alex Baptiste and Gary Taylor-Fletcher respectively, giving Blackpool their fourth consecutive draw. The final match before the closure of the transfer window was a trip to Welsh side Swansea City, where Watford continued with their 4–4–2 formation. The departures of Smith, Williamson and McAnuff meant that Lansbury and Marvin Sordell made their first starts, and helped Hodson retain his place in the team. Graham nutmegged goalkeeper Dorus de Vries to put Watford ahead, but Swansea defender Alan Tate scored a late header to salvage a 1–1 draw.

Watford did not play another game for two weeks, due to international fixtures. On the resumption of club football, they faced Barnsley and Plymouth Argyle, who were both near the bottom of the Championship at the time. Watford changed to a 4–5–1 formation for the home match against Barnsley, with Jon Harley replacing Sordell. Their other change to the starting lineup was an enforced one. Captain Jay DeMerit suffered an injury whilst on international duty with the US, and was replaced by Dale Bennett, who made his Football League debut. Graham scored the only goal of the game with a close-range finish in the 54th minute. Watford's clean sheet was their first in the league since March. (Note: A clean sheet refers to the achievement of playing an entire match without conceding a goal.) Playing the same formation, they recorded an identical result at Plymouth, with Tom Cleverley's early goal proving decisive. For both of these wins, Watford's defence consisted entirely of players who had progressed from their youth system.

Former Watford player Heiðar Helguson rejoined Watford on loan from QPR on 15 September 2009, and his first game was as a substitute against Leicester City. With Watford trailing 2–0 at half time, Mackay changed from a 4–5–1 formation to a 4–4–2, with striker Helguson replacing attacking midfielder Henri Lansbury. Helguson's impact was immediate. He set up Graham for Watford's opening goal, before scoring twice to put Watford into a 3–2 lead. However, Helguson suffered an injury shortly before the end of the match, and Ellington replaced him for the final ten minutes. Leicester subsequently equalised, and the match ended 3–3. A total of 3,389 Watford fans attended the away match against Reading, who were managed by ex-Watford manager Brendan Rodgers. Former Watford player Grzegorz Rasiak scored Reading's goal, in a match that also saw Jobi McAnuff and Brynjar Gunnarsson facing their former club. Graham equalised for Watford, and despite a red card for Ellington, the match finished as a draw. Preparation for Watford's game against Coventry City was affected by a virus affecting six first-team players. Will Hoskins scored his first goal of the season, but Coventry scored three goals to inflict Watford's first home defeat of the season. Four days later Cardiff City defeated Watford 4–0; Watford's heaviest home league defeat since January 2004.

Don Cowie made his debut for Scotland during the October international break. Upon the resumption of club football, Watford recorded an away win at Middlesbrough, who had just been relegated from the Premier League. Three days later, Ipswich led Watford 1–0 at the end of standard time at Portman Road, but Nathan Ellington equalised in the last minute to deny Ipswich their first league win of 2009–10. Watford's game against Sheffield Wednesday was their third in seven days, and first goals of the season for Lansbury, Adrian Mariappa and Jon Harley ensured Watford's second win in that time. Eight days later Watford travelled to fourth-placed West Bromwich Albion. Watford were defeated 5–0—their heaviest defeat of the season and biggest ever defeat against West Brom. They responded with a home win over Preston in their next match, with Cleverley scoring to join Danny Graham as the club's leading goalscorer of the season.

After a break for the last international fixtures of 2009, Watford resumed the season with a 3–0 home win over Scunthorpe United. Helguson scored two goals, meaning that at that point he was averaging more than a goal per game in 2009–10. Watford suffered consecutive defeats away to Crystal Palace and Newcastle, failing to score in either match. The Newcastle match was followed by a home game against Queens Park Rangers two days later, due to television coverage. Lloyd Doyley scored his first ever goal in professional football to equalise before half-time, and Watford eventually won 3–1. This marked Watford's fourth consecutive home win, and took them into a playoff position. Such was the surprise at Doyley's goal, that the club released a commemorative T-shirt, with the slogan "I was there when Lloyd scored!" However, Watford's sequence of home wins ended with a 1–0 loss to Derby County, and was followed by a defeat at the league's then bottom side, Peterborough United—their first win since sacking manager Darren Ferguson. The team finished 2009 with consecutive draws against Nottingham Forest and Bristol City.

=== 2010 ===
- Watford's lineup for the final match of 2009–10, a 4–0 win against Coventry at their stadium, the Ricoh Arena.

Watford's start to 2010 was impacted by the unusually cold winter, which caused the postponement of two home matches in January. Consequently, they played only two matches that month: 2–1 and 3–2 defeats away to Doncaster Rovers and Blackpool respectively. They recorded two wins and a defeat from their first three matches of February, before again suffering a postponement, this time due to a waterlogged pitch at Loftus Road. A 2–2 draw against Scunthorpe United on 20 February left Watford 13th in the Championship on 39 points, having played the fewest matches of any club in the division.

Mackay later remarked that fixture congestion in March and April caught up on his relatively small squad. Between 20 February and 20 April, Watford played fifteen matches, winning two (against Plymouth Argyle and Ipswich Town), drawing four and losing nine. Although they never entered the relegation zone, with five games remaining they were separated from it only on goal difference. However, wins against Plymouth, Reading and Coventry City ensured that Watford remained in the Championship for the 2010–11 season.

=== Results ===
8 August 2009 Match 1	Watford	1–1	Doncaster Rovers	Vicarage Road, Watford
	Graham 27'		Hayter 38'	Attendance: 15,636; Referee: Swarbrick

15 August 2009 Match 2	Sheffield United	2–0	Watford	Bramall Lane, Sheffield
	Ward 12'; Evans 63'			Attendance: 24,638; Referee: Oliver

18 August 2009 Match 3	Nottingham Forest	2–4	Watford	City Ground, Nottingham
	Blackstock 45+2'; Adebola 87'		Graham 31'; Williamson 76'; Smith 80'; Cleverley 90+2'	Attendance: 19,232; Referee: Bates

22 August 2009 Match 4	Watford	2–2	Blackpool	Vicarage Road, Watford
	Smith 24'; Cleverley 63'		Baptiste 56'; Taylor-Fletcher 72'	Attendance: 12,745; Referee: Deadman

29 August 2009 Match 5	Swansea City	1–1	Watford	Liberty Stadium, Swansea, Wales
	Tate 90+3'		Graham 66'	Attendance: 14,172; Referee: Taylor

12 September 2009 Match 6	Watford	1–0	Barnsley	Vicarage Road, Watford
	Graham 36'			Attendance: 12,613; Referee: Phillips

15 September 2009 Match 7	Plymouth Argyle	0–1	Watford	Home Park, Plymouth
			Cleverley 4'	Attendance: 8,703; Referee: Scott

19 September 2009 Match 8	Watford	3–3	Leicester City	Vicarage Road, Watford
	Graham 58'; Helguson 60', 77'		Fryatt (pen 20), 40'; N'Guessan 90+1'	Attendance: 14,647; Referee: Pawson

26 September 2009 Match 9	Reading	1–1	Watford	Madejski Stadium, Reading
	Rasiak 7'		Graham 66'; Ellington (yellow card) 85' (red card)	Attendance: 18,147; Referee: Haywood

29 September 2009 Match 10	Watford	2–3	Coventry City	Vicarage Road, Watford
	Cleverley 21'; Hoskins 37'		Clingan 14'; Best 67', 84'	Attendance: 13,034; Referee: Marriner

3 October 2009 Match 11	Watford	0–4	Cardiff City	Vicarage Road, Watford
			Peter Whittingham (pen 24), 66'; Matthews 41'; Bothroyd 67'	Attendance: 13,895; Referee: Woolmer

17 October 2009 Match 12	Middlesbrough	0–1	Watford	Riverside Stadium, Middlesbrough
			Cleverley 26'	Attendance: 18,957; Referee: Mathieson

20 October 2009 Match 13	Ipswich Town	1–1	Watford	Portman Road, Ipswich
	McAuley 5'		Ellington 90+4'	Attendance: 19,289; Referee: Kettle

23 October 2009 Match 14	Watford	4–1	Sheffield Wednesday	Vicarage Road, Watford
	Mariappa 21'; Lansbury 26', 61'; Harley 54'		Tudgay 45'	Attendance: 14,591; Referee: Crossley

31 October 2009 Match 15	West Bromwich Albion	5–0	Watford	The Hawthorns, West Bromwich
	Olsson 5'; Dorrans pen 18'; Moore 49'; Zuiverloon 63'; Cox 68'			Attendance: 21,421; Referee: Miller

7 November 2009 Match 16	Watford	2–0	Preston	Vicarage Road, Watford
	Helguson 9'; Cleverley 33'			Attendance: 13,524; Referee: Wright

21 November 2009 Match 17	Watford	3–0	Scunthorpe United	Vicarage Road, Watford
	Helguson 19', 22'; Graham 48'			Attendance: 13,241; Referee: Sarginson

28 November 2009 Match 18	Crystal Palace	3–0	Watford	Selhurst Park, London
	Moses 2'; A Lee 6'; Ambrose 54'			Attendance: 14,085; Referee: Langford

5 December 2009 Match 19	Newcastle United	2–0	Watford	St James' Park, Newcastle upon Tyne
	Løvenkrands 20'; Pancrate 83'; Nolan (yellow card) 49' (red card)			Attendance: 43,050; Referee: Moss

7 December 2009 Match 20	Watford	3–1	QPR	Vicarage Road, Watford
	Doyley 43'; Cowie 56'; Cleverley 90+4'		Agyemang 33'	Attendance: 15,058; Referee: Penn

12 December 2009 Match 21	Watford	0–1	Derby County	Vicarage Road, Watford
			Porter 77'	Attendance: 14,063; Referee: Stroud

19 December 2009 Match 22	Peterborough United	2–1	Watford	London Road, Peterborough
	Frecklington 9'; Geohaghon 78'		Eustace 49'	Attendance: 7,723; Referee: Evans

26 December 2009 Match 23	Watford	0–0	Nottingham Forest	Vicarage Road, Watford
				Attendance: 17,086; Referee: D'Urso

28 December 2009 Match 24	Bristol City	2–2	Watford	Ashton Gate, Bristol
	Haynes 38'; Hartley 45+2'; Nyatanga (yellow card) 69' (red card)		Cleverley 43'; Eustace 90+3'	Attendance: 16,035; Referee: Linington

9 January 2010	Watford	P–P	Sheffield United	Vicarage Road, Watford

16 January 2010 Match 25	Doncaster Rovers	2–1	Watford	Keepmoat Stadium, Doncaster
	Shiels 50'; Roberts 80'		Helguson (pen 90 + 3)	Attendance: 10,504; Referee: Hall

23 January 2010 Match 26	Blackpool	3–2	Watford	Bloomfield Road, Blackpool
	Adam 17'; Southern 89'; Ormerod 90+1'		Lansbury 27'; Cleverley 79'	Attendance: 6,855; Referee: Boyeson

30 January 2010	Watford	P–P	Swansea City	Vicarage Road, Watford

2 February 2010 Match 27	Watford	3–0	Sheffield United	Vicarage Road, Watford
	Cleverley 39'; Helguson 55'; Cowie 74'			Attendance: 13,076; Referee: Hill

6 February 2010 Match 28	Barnsley	1–0	Watford	Oakwell, Barnsley
	Hallfredsson 66'; Shotton (red card) 76'			Attendance: 11,739; Referee: Graham

9 February 2010 Match 29	Watford	2–0	Bristol City	Vicarage Road, Watford
	Helguson 14'; Taylor 34'			Attendance: 12,179; Referee: McDermid

16 February 2010	QPR	P–P	Watford	Loftus Road, London

20 February 2010 Match 30	Scunthorpe United	2–2	Watford	Glanford Park, Scunthorpe
	Hooper 42', (pen 90 + 5)		Graham 64'; Eustace 90+1'; Cleverley (red card) 82'	Attendance: 5,411; Referee: Webb

27 February 2010 Match 31	Watford	1–2	Newcastle United	Vicarage Road, Watford
	Hoskins 90+1'		Coloccini 4'; Carroll 50'	Attendance: 17,120; Referee: Bates

6 March 2010 Match 32	Derby County	2–0	Watford	Pride Park Stadium, Derby
	Tonge 12'; Porter 77'			Attendance: 29,492; Referee: Horwood

9 March 2010 Match 33	Watford	0–1	Swansea City	Vicarage Road, Watford
			Kuqi 18'	Attendance: 12,907; Referee: Kettle

13 March 2010 Match 34	Watford	0–1	Peterborough United	Vicarage Road, Watford
			Dickinson 51'	Attendance: 16,591; Referee: Taylor

16 March 2010 Match 35	Watford	2–1	Ipswich Town	Vicarage Road, Watford
	Lansbury 7'; Hoskins 77'		Colback 68'	Attendance: 13,996; Referee: Salisbury

21 March 2010 Match 36	Cardiff City	3–1	Watford	Cardiff City Stadium, Cardiff
	McCormack 7'; Whittingham 63'; Burke 78'		Helguson 90+3'	Attendance: 20,130; Referee: Crossley

24 March 2010 Match 37	Sheffield Wednesday	2–1	Watford	Hillsborough Stadium, Sheffield
	Nolan 56'; Varney 89'		Cleverley 67'	Attendance: 18,449; Referee: Deadman

27 March 2010 Match 38	Watford	1–1	Middlesbrough	Vicarage Road, Watford
	Eustace 21'		Lita 55'	Attendance: 14,038; Referee: East

30 March 2010 Match 39	Watford	1–3	Crystal Palace	Vicarage Road, Watford
	Graham 83'		John 31'; Scannell 51'; Danns 66'; Hills (yellow card) 87' (red card)	Attendance: 15,134; Referee: Taylor

3 April 2010 Match 40	Preston North End	1–1	Watford	Deepdale, Preston
	Davidson 53'		Buckley 35'	Attendance: 12,534; Referee: Shoebridge

5 April 2010 Match 41	Watford	1–1	West Bromwich Albion	Vicarage Road, Watford
	Graham 85'		Brunt 90+5'	Attendance: 14,555; Referee: Tanner

10 April 2010 Match 42	Watford	1–0	Plymouth Argyle	Vicarage Road, Watford
	Helguson 50'			Attendance: 14,246; Referee: Atkins

17 April 2010 Match 43	Leicester City	4–1	Watford	Walkers Stadium, Leicester
				Attendance: 24,765; Referee: Miller

20 April 2010 Match 44	QPR	1–0	Watford	Loftus Road, London
	Buzsaky 38' (pen.)			Attendance: 13,171; Referee: Miller

24 April 2010 Match 45	Watford	3–0	Reading	Vicarage Road, Watford
				Attendance: 15,949; Referee: Friend

2 May 2010 Match 46	Coventry City	0–4	Watford	Ricoh Arena, Coventry
				Attendance: 19,103; Referee: Halsey

==== Summary ====
From their 3rd game until their 31st, Watford found themselves in a mid-table position; seldom in the top six, but several points clear of the relegation zone. A series of fixture postponements meant that, as of their 30th fixture, Watford had played fewer matches than any other Championship team. The postponements were followed by a run of one win in 12 games between February and April, leading to Watford slipping close to the relegation places. With five matches to play, they were 21st, ahead of Sheffield Wednesday only on goal difference. Survival was sealed in the penultimate match with a 3–0 win against Reading. A subsequent victory at Coventry elevated Watford to a final position of 16th, their highest place in the table for two months. The team finished with 54 points – 16 fewer than Blackpool in the final playoff position, and 7 more than Sheffield Wednesday, the highest placed of the three relegated teams.

Key

- W: Win
- D: Draw
- L: Loss
- GF: Goals for
- GA: Goals against
- GD: Goal difference
- H: Home fixture
- A: Away fixture
- Pld: Games played
- Pts: Points scored
- Playoff position (3–6)
- Relegation position (22–24)

Game	1	2	3	4	5	6	7	8	9	10	11	12	13	14	15	16	17	18	19	20	21	22	23	24	25	26	27	28	29	30	31	32	33	34	35	36	37	38	39	40	41	42	43	44	45	46
Ground	H	A	A	H	A	H	A	H	A	H	H	A	A	H	A	H	H	A	A	H	H	A	H	A	A	A	H	A	H	A	H	A	H	H	H	A	A	H	H	A	H	H	A	A	H	A
Result	D	L	W	D	D	W	W	D	D	L	L	W	D	W	L	W	W	L	L	W	L	L	D	D	L	L	W	L	W	D	L	L	L	L	W	L	L	D	L	D	D	W	L	L	W	W
Points	1	1	4	5	6	9	12	13	14	14	14	17	18	21	21	24	27	27	27	30	30	30	31	32	32	32	35	35	38	39	39	39	39	39	42	42	42	43	43	44	45	48	48	48	51	54
Position	8	22	11	12	13	10	6	8	7	11	15	12	12	10	12	12	8	9	12	6	10	13	13	13	14	14	12	12	11	13	15	17	18	19	19	19	21	21	21	21	21	19	20	20	19	16

Overall								Home						Away					
Pld	W	D	L	GF	GA	GD	Pts	W	D	L	GF	GA	GD	W	D	L	GF	GA	GD
46	14	12	20	61	68	−7	54	10	6	7	36	26	+10	4	6	13	25	42	−17

== League Cup ==
=== First round ===
The first round draw for the 2009–10 League Cup (known as the Carling Cup for sponsorship reasons) took place on 16 June 2009. It included all Football League clubs for the forthcoming season with the exception of Newcastle and Middlesbrough, who were given byes to the second round. Watford were drawn to play an away match against north London side Barnet. Barnet were two divisions below Watford, in Football League Two. In the match, Malky Mackay gave a first competitive start to 17-year-old academy right back Lee Hodson and a first game of the season to goalkeeper Richard Lee. The match was goalless after 90 minutes, before Scott Severin and Mike Williamson scored for Watford in extra time.

11 August 2009 First round	Barnet	0–2 (a.e.t.)	Watford	Underhill Stadium, Barnet
			Williamson 105'; Severin 120+3'	Attendance: 3,139; Referee: Cook

=== Second round ===
The second round draw, held on 12 August 2009, included the 35 winners from the first round, as well as Newcastle, Middlesbrough, and the 13 Premier League teams not involved in the UEFA Champions League or UEFA Europa League. Leeds United were selected as the home side against Watford, in what would be the first match between the two teams since the 2006 Football League Championship play-off final. Leeds took the lead with a Robert Snodgrass goal in the 38th minute. Marvin Sordell scored his first senior goal for Watford, taking the game to extra time. However, Snodgrass scored his and Leeds' second goal to secure a 2–1 victory for the League One side.

25 August 2009 Second round	Leeds United	2–1 (a.e.t.)	Watford	Elland Road, Leeds
	Snodgrass 38', 98'		Sordell 87'	Attendance: 14,681; Referee: Hall

== FA Cup ==
Premier League and Championship clubs enter the FA Cup at the third round stage, where they are joined by the 20 winners from the second round for a total of 64 teams. The draw took place on 8 December 2009. For the third consecutive cup draw of the season, Watford were the away side, this time against 2008–09 FA Cup winners Chelsea. Watford's first match of the year was an FA Cup third round match away to holders Chelsea. Despite the absence of Chelsea's top scorers Didier Drogba and Nicolas Anelka, Watford conceded five goals without reply, and were eliminated from the competition.

3 January 2010 Third round	Chelsea	5–0	Watford	Stamford Bridge, London
	Sturridge 6', 69'; Eustace 15' o.g. Malouda 23'; Lampard 65'			Attendance: 40,912; Referee: Friend

== Players ==
=== Statistics ===
Over the course of the season, 31 players made at least one first team appearance for Watford. Of these, Adrian Mariappa was the only one to start all 49 matches. Goalkeeper Scott Loach started every league match, while Danny Graham also played some part in every Watford fixture. Graham also finished as the club's top scorer with 14 goals, all of them coming in the Football League. Tied for second place were Heiðar Helguson and Tom Cleverley, both of whom scored 11 goals. Three Watford players were sent off in 2009–10: Cleverley, Jon Harley and Nathan Ellington received one red card each.

No. = Squad number

Pos = Playing position

P = Number of games played

G = Number of goals scored

GK = Goalkeeper

DF = Defender

MF = Midfielder

FW = Forward

= Yellow cards

= Red cards

Correct as of the final game of the season. Starting appearances are listed first, followed by substitute appearances in parentheses where applicable.

2009–10 Watford playing statistics
No.	Pos	Name	P	G	P	G	P	G	P	G	Yellow cards	Red cards	Notes
No.	Pos	Name	Championship		FA Cup		League Cup		Total		Discipline		Notes
1	GK	Scott Loach	46	0	1	0	0	0	47	0	2	0	—
2	DF	Adrian Mariappa	46	1	1	0	2	0	49	1	6	0	—
3	DF	Jure Travner	0	0	0	0	0	0	0	0	0	0	—
4	MF	Scott Severin	4(5)	0	1	0	1	1	6(5)	1	0	0	—
5	MF	Henri Lansbury	34(3)	5	1	0	0(1)	0	35(4)	5	10	0	Joined club on 21 August 2009
6	DF	Jay DeMerit	25(2)	0	1	0	0	0	26(3)	0	2	0	—
7	MF	Don Cowie	40(1)	2	1	0	2	0	43(1)	2	1	0	—
8	MF	Stephen McGinn	2(7)	0	0	0	0	0	2(7)	0	1	0	Joined club on 15 January 2010
8	MF	Tommy Smith	4	2	0	0	1	0	5	2	0	0	Left club on 27 August 2009
10	FW	Danny Graham	37(9)	14	1	0	2	0	40(9)	14	2	0	—
11	FW	Heiðar Helguson	26(3)	11	0	0	0	0	26(3)	11	3	0	Joined club on 15 September 2009 (Note: Helguson's loan originally ended on 31 December 2009. He rejoined QPR for the first part of January, playing for them in an FA Cup third round tie against Sheffield United. He signed a loan extension with Watford on 11 January 2010.)
11	MF	Jobi McAnuff	3	0	0	0	1	0	4	0	0	0	Left club on 27 August 2009
12	DF	Lloyd Doyley	43(1)	1	1	0	2	0	46(1)	1	2	0	—
13	GK	Jonathan North	0	0	0	0	0	0	0	0	0	0	—
14	MF	Ross Jenkins	21(3)	0	0(1)	0	1	0	22(4)	0	1	0	—
15	MF	Jon Harley	20(18)	1	0(1)	0	0(1)	0	20(20)	1	4	1	—
16	GK	Richard Lee	0	0	0	0	2	0	2	0	0	0	—
17	DF	Dale Bennett	8(2)	0	0	0	0	0	8(2)	0	1	0	—
18	FW	Will Hoskins	5(13)	3	0	0	1	0	6(13)	3	0	0	—
19	FW	Liam Henderson	0(13)	0	0(1)	0	0(1)	0	0(15)	0	1	0	—
20	MF	Tom Cleverley	33	11	1	0	1	0	35	11	5	1	Joined club on 17 August 2009.
22	DF	Craig Cathcart	12	0	0	0	0	0	12	0	0	0	Joined club on 14 September 2009, and left on 5 January 2010
22	MF	Will Buckley	4(2)	1	0	0	0	0	4(2)	1	1	0	Joined club on 26 January 2010.
24	DF	Martin Taylor	17(2)	2	0	0	0	0	17(2)	2	1	0	
24	DF	Mike Williamson	4	1	0	0	2	1	6	2	0	0	Left club on 1 September 2009.
25	FW	Nathan Ellington	2(15)	1	0	0	0(1)	0	2(16)	1	2	1	Left club on 1 January 2010
26	MF	John-Joe O'Toole	0	0	0	0	0	0	0	0	0	0	Left club on 1 September 2009. (Note: O'Toole was initially loaned to Colchester United, and later transferred there permanently.)
26	FW	Ryan Noble	0	0	0	0	0	0	0	0	0	0	—
27	DF	Mat Sadler	0	0	0	0	0	0	0	0	0	0	—
28	MF	John Eustace	39(3)	4	1	0	2	0	42(3)	4	11	0	—
29	MF	Michael Bryan	1(6)	0	0	0	0	0	1(6)	0	0	0	—
30	MF	Rob Kiernan	0	0	0	0	0	0	0	0	0	0	—
31	FW	Marvin Sordell	1(4)	1	0	0	0(1)	1	1(5)	2	2	0	—
33	DF	Lee Hodson	29(2)	0	1	0	2	0	32(2)	0	2	0	—
34	DF	Eddie Oshodi	0(1)	0	0	0	0	0	0(1)	0	0	0	—
36	FW	Kurtney Brooks	0	0	0	0	0(1)	0	0(1)	0	0	0	—
37	GK	Jonathan Bond	0	0	0	0	0	0	0	0	0	0	—
38	MF	Piero Mingoia	0	0	0	0	0	0	0	0	0	0	—
39	FW	Gavin Massey	0(1)	0	0	0	0	0	0(1)	0	0	0	—

=== Awards ===
- Player of the season: Tom Cleverley
- Player's player of the season: John Eustace
- Young player of the season: Scott Loach
- Goal of the season: Lloyd Doyley (vs QPR on 7 December 2009)
- Hall of fame inductee: Nigel Gibbs

=== Transfers ===
==== In ====
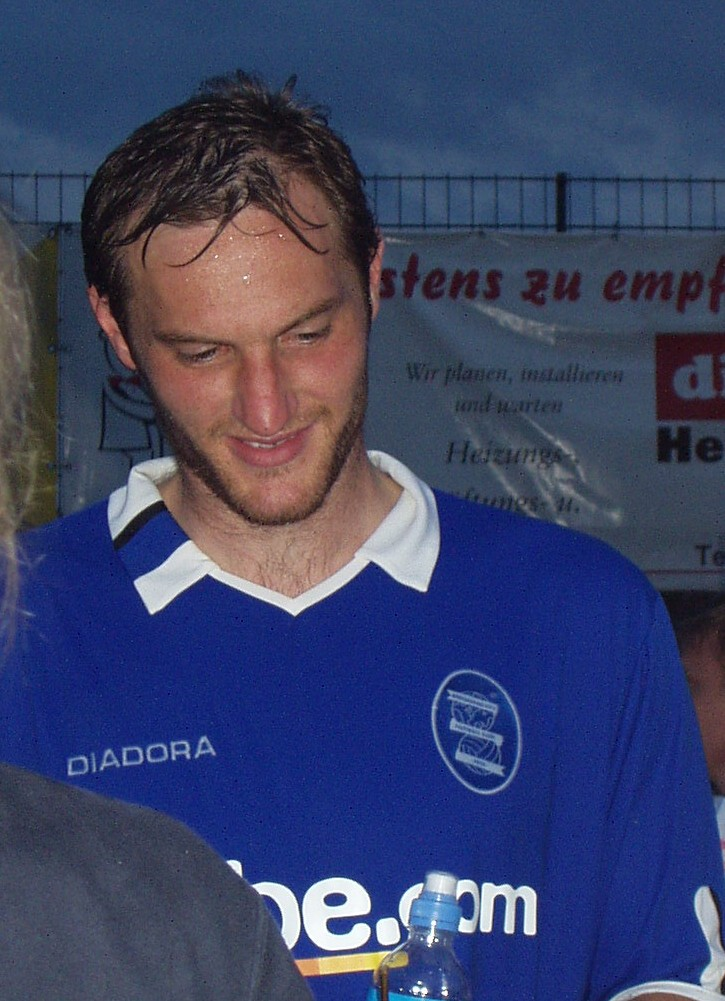
Martin Taylor joined Watford from Birmingham City in January 2010.

Watford signed three permanent players before the first game of the season: former Scotland international Scott Severin, Carlisle United striker Danny Graham, and Slovenian left back Jure Travner. The transfer window closed at the end of 1 September 2009, meaning that Watford could not buy or sell further players until the opening of the January transfer window on 1 January 2010. The club took this opportunity to sign Scotland under-21 international Stephen McGinn, young Rochdale winger Will Buckley, and 30-year-old centre back Martin Taylor.

Unless a country is specified, all clubs play in the English football league system.

Date	Player	From	Fee
1 July 2009	Scott Severin	Aberdeen (Scotland)	Free
2 July 2009	Danny Graham	Carlisle United	£200,000 (Note: Watford must also pay £30,000 per 15 appearances, up to a maximum of 75 appearances, plus a one-off fee of £200,000 if they achieve promotion to the Premier League in 2009–10, 2010–11 or 2011–12.)
18 July 2009	Jure Travner	Celje (Slovenia)	Undisclosed
15 January 2010	Stephen McGinn	St Mirren (Scotland)	Undisclosed
26 January 2010	Will Buckley	Rochdale	Undisclosed
29 January 2010	Martin Taylor	Birmingham City	Free

==== Out ====
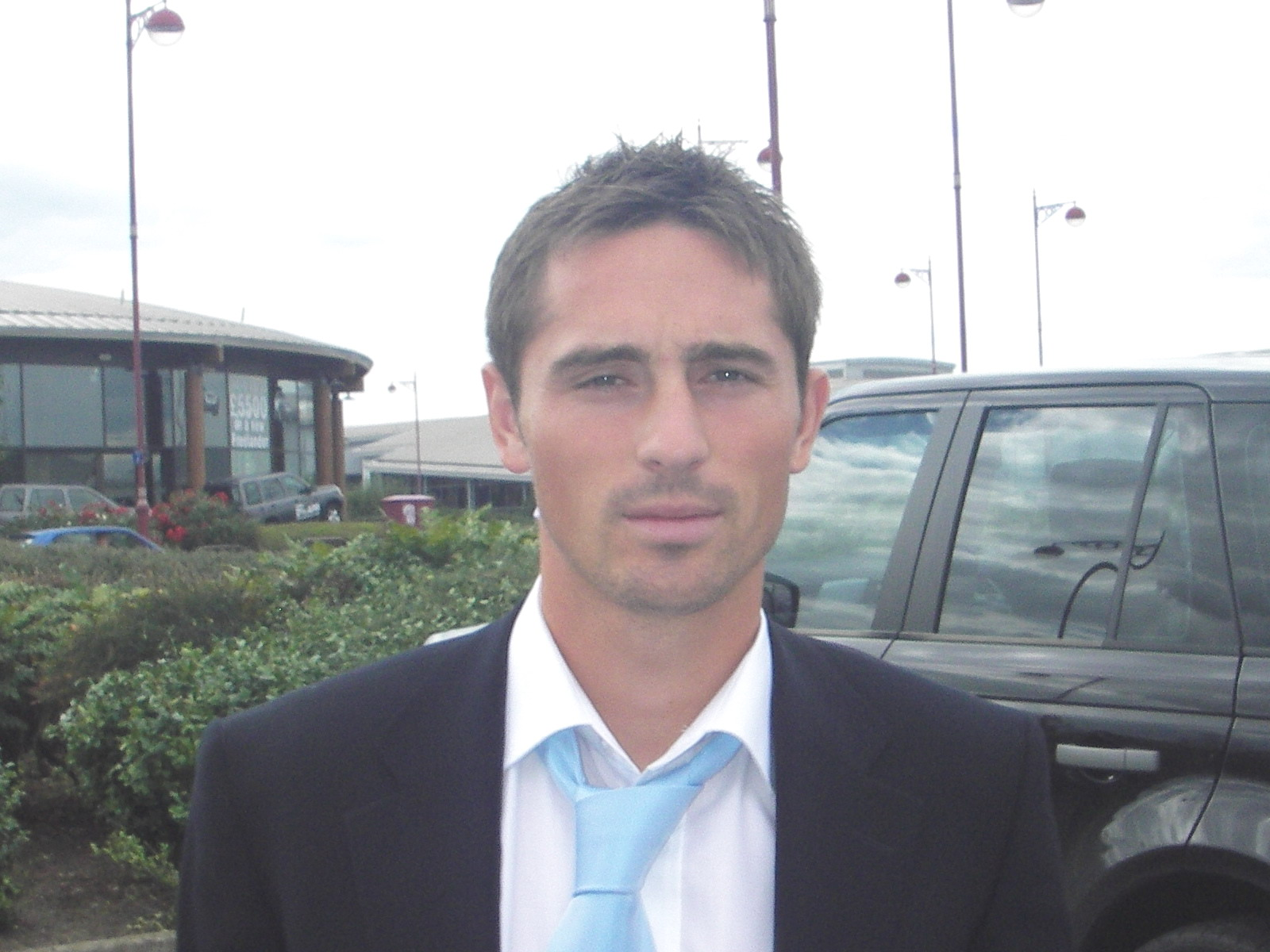
Tommy Smith joined Portsmouth on 27 August 2009.

The club's financial shortfall necessitated the sale of players in the summer of 2009, with Jimmy Russo confirming in the annual accounts that the club would need to continue to sell players "year on year" in order to "meet the financial requirements of the business." After the early departures of Theo Robinson and Al Bangura, Tamás Priskin was sold to Ipswich Town in the first week of August, just before the start of the Championship season. Despite being able to transfer players at any stage between 1 July and 1 September, Watford conducted much of their business in the last week of the transfer window. Portsmouth submitted transfer bids for Smith and Williamson. Negotiations with Reading for Smith were ongoing, while their bid for McAnuff was accepted. Smith's transfer to Portsmouth and McAnuff's move to Reading were confirmed before Watford's match against Swansea City, with Williamson's transfer following a few days after. Mackay later expressed frustration at the latter transfer, revealing that after Watford rejected Williamson's transfer request, he declared himself unfit to train, play, or travel to Swansea.

Watford's final sale of the season came when the January transfer window opened on 1 January 2010. John-Joe O'Toole, who was already on loan at Colchester United, was signed on a permanent transfer by former Watford manager Aidy Boothroyd.

All clubs play in the English football league system.

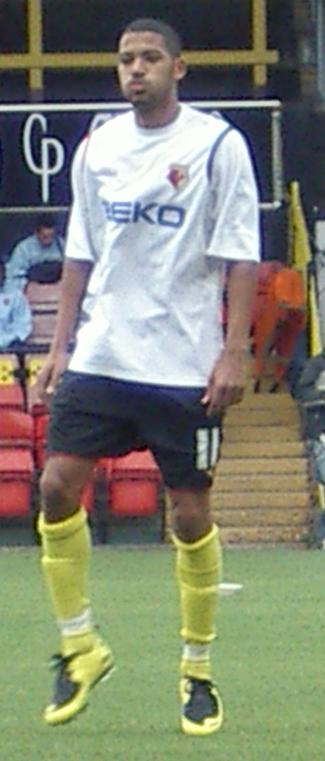
Jobi McAnuff was sold to Reading in August.

Date (Note: "End of season" denotes players who were available for the final game of the season, and subsequently left upon the expiry of their contracts.)	Player	To	Fee
3 July 2009	Theo Robinson	Huddersfield Town	Undisclosed
23 July 2009	Al Bangura	Released (Note: Bangura later joined Blackpool.)	Mutual termination
7 August 2009	Tamás Priskin	Ipswich Town	Undisclosed
27 August 2009	Jobi McAnuff	Reading	Undisclosed
27 August 2009	Tommy Smith	Portsmouth	Undisclosed
1 September 2009	Mike Williamson	Portsmouth	£2 million (Note: Possibly rising to £3 million. Deal also includes a sell-on clause.)
1 January 2010	John-Joe O'Toole	Colchester United	Undisclosed
21 June 2010	Jordan Parkes	Released (Note: Parkes later signed for Barnet.)	Mutual termination
30 June 2010	Richard Lee	Released (Note: Lee subsequently signed for Brentford.)	Free (end of contract)
End of season	Jay DeMerit	Released	Free (end of contract)
End of season	Will Hoskins	Released (Note: Hoskins later signed for Bristol Rovers.)	Free (end of contract)
End of season	Jon Harley	Released (Note: Harley subsequently joined Notts County.)	Free (end of contract)

=== Loans ===
==== In ====
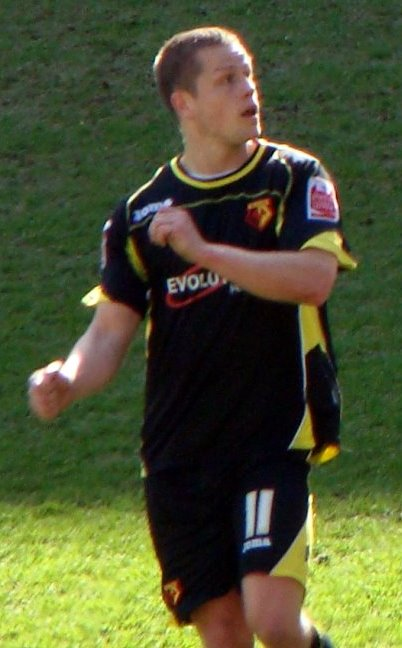
After leaving the club in 2005, Heiðar Helguson rejoined Watford on loan for 2009–10.

Having sold several first team players, Watford used the loan system to sign young players from Premier League clubs, offering them early experience of competitive football. First to arrive was Tom Cleverley, who scored on his debut and was eventually voted Watford F.C. Player of the Season. Other players acquired in this manner included his Manchester United teammate Craig Cathcart, and Arsenal midfielder Henri Lansbury. Watford's other significant loan acquisition was former player Heiðar Helguson. The Iceland international made an instant impact on his return to Vicarage Road, scoring two goals as a substitute in a 3–3 draw against Leicester City.

Start	Player	From	End
17 August 2009	Tom Cleverley	Manchester United	End of season
21 August 2009	Henri Lansbury	Arsenal	End of season
14 September 2009	Craig Cathcart	Manchester United	4 January 2010
15 September 2009	Heiðar Helguson	QPR	End of season
25 March 2010	Ryan Noble	Sunderland	20 April 2010

==== Out ====
For similar reasons to their young acquisitions, Watford loaned players such as O'Toole, Billy Gibson and Marvin Sordell to lower-league sides, in the hope that they would gain first-team experience. They also used the system to send Mat Sadler to Stockport County, and Nathan Ellington to Greek side Skoda Xanthi. In both cases, the loans were made with the option of a possible permanent move.

Start	Player	To	End
1 September 2009	John-Joe O'Toole	Colchester United	1 January 2010
16 December 2009	Billy Gibson	Wealdstone	11 February 2010
1 January 2010	Nathan Ellington	Skoda Xanthi (Greece)	31 December 2010
22 January 2010	Jonathan North	Oxford City	February 2010
29 January 2010	Mat Sadler	Stockport County	End of Season
1 February 2010	Scott Severin	Kilmarnock (Scotland)	End of Season
1 February 2010	Rob Kiernan	Kilmarnock (Scotland)	End of Season
1 February 2010	Marvin Sordell	Tranmere Rovers	April 2010
19 March 2010	Lewis Young	Hereford United	April 2010

=== International ===
Four Watford players represented their country at senior international level in 2009–10. Club captain Jay DeMerit played for the United States in the Confederations Cup, where he helped his team reach the final at the expense of Spain, and the 2010 World Cup, where he played against England and Slovenia. Heiðar Helguson played five matches for Iceland, scoring two international goals in a 4–0 win over Andorra. Don Cowie made his debut for Scotland against Japan, and was selected again by manager George Burley to play against Wales. Another debutant was Michael Bryan. He toured the United States with Northern Ireland, making his international debut as a substitute against Turkey and four days later starting for his country against World Cup qualifiers Chile.

Several further players participated in youth international matches. Loan duo Tom Cleverley and Henri Lansbury played alongside goalkeeper Scott Loach in England under-21s UEFA Euro 2011 qualifying campaign. Reserve team defender Jordan Parkes played for England against Uzbekistan at the FIFA Under-20 World Cup, and Ross Jenkins also played for the team in a friendly against Montenegro. Other professional players to represent their countries at youth level included Lee Hodson and Craig Cathcart for Northern Ireland under-21, Stephen McGinn for Scotland under-21, Rob Kiernan for Ireland under 19s, and Eddie Oshodi for England under-17s.

Country	Team	Player
England	Under-21	Tom Cleverley
England	Under-21	Henri Lansbury
England	Under-21	Scott Loach
England	Under-20	Ross Jenkins
England	Under-20	Jordan Parkes
England	Under-17	Eddie Oshodi
Iceland	Men's senior	Heiðar Helguson
Malta	Under-17	Vjorn Sultana
Northern Ireland	Men's senior	Michael Bryan
Northern Ireland	Under-21	Michael Bryan
Northern Ireland	Under-21	Craig Cathcart
Northern Ireland	Under-21	Lee Hodson
Northern Ireland	Under-17	Adam Thompson
Northern Ireland	Under-17	Jack Warburton
Northern Ireland	Under-16	Dominic Ball

Country	Team	Player
Republic of Ireland	Under-19	Rob Kiernan
Republic of Ireland	Under-17	Jack Bonham
Republic of Ireland	Under-17	Sean Murray
Republic of Ireland	Under-17	Connor Smith
Scotland	Men's senior	Don Cowie
Scotland	Under-21	Stephen McGinn
United States	Men's senior	Jay DeMerit
Wales	Under-21	Kurtney Brooks
Wales	Under-21	Jonathan North
Wales	Under-17	Jonathan Bond

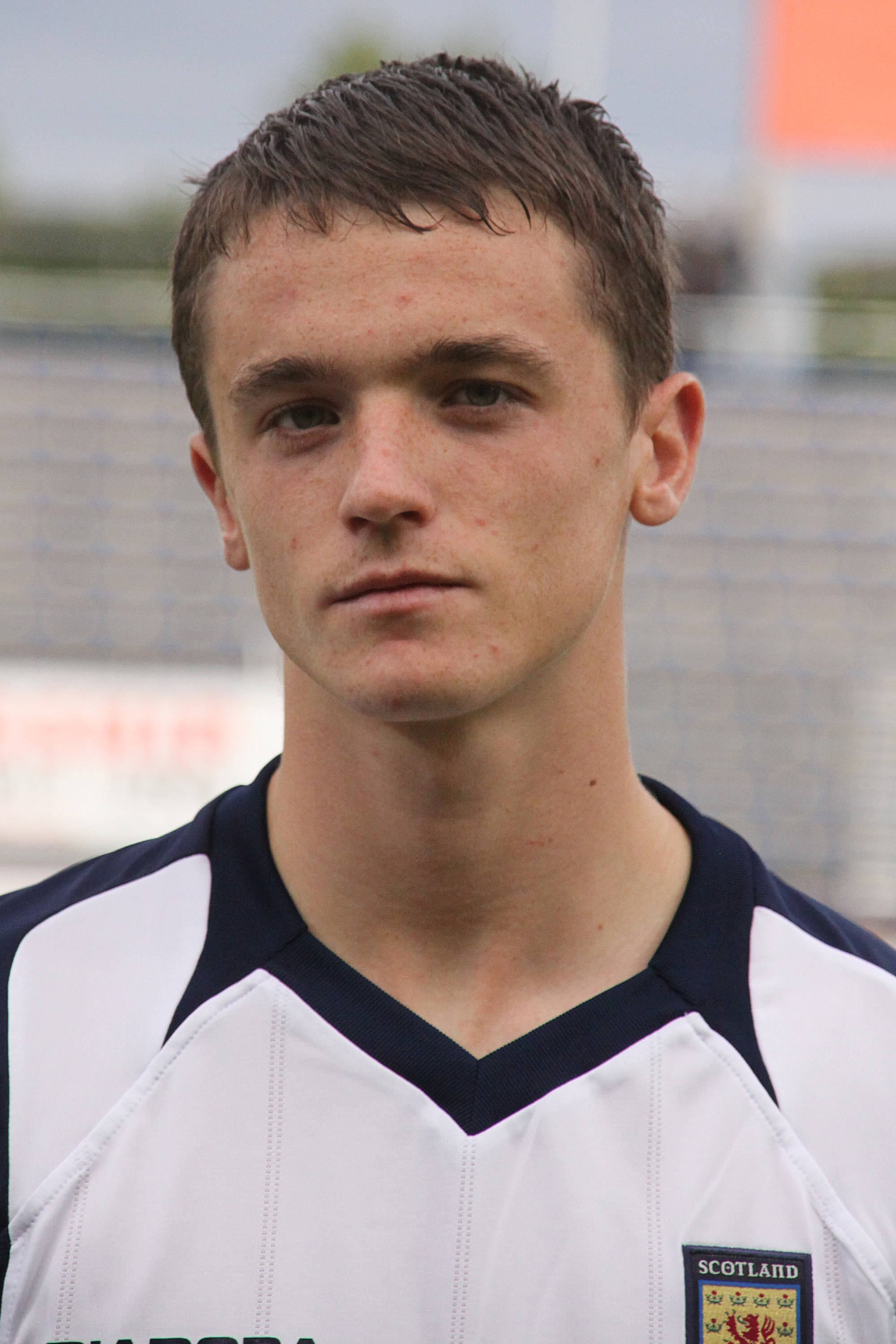
Stephen McGinn played international football for Scotland under-21s.

== Management and coaching staff ==
Watford's managerial and coaching setup changed considerably between May and July 2009. Manager Brendan Rodgers left Watford to join Reading, and was joined by assistant manager Dean Austin, football consultant Frank Lampard and physiologist Karl Halabi. As a result, previous reserve team manager Malky Mackay became the club's new permanent manager, with youth team coach Sean Dyche becoming his assistant. Mackay also appointed former Northampton Town and Nottingham Forest coach David Kerslake as a first team coach.

Position	Staff
Manager	Malky Mackay
Assistant manager	Sean Dyche
First team coach	David Kerslake
Goalkeeping Coach	Alec Chamberlain
Head of Football Business and Development	John Stephenson
Head of Conditioning/coach	Martyn Pert
Head of Medical	Richard Collinge
Strength and Conditioning coach	Mathew Monte-Colombo
Chief Performance Analyst	Neil McIlhargey
Kit Manager	Bob Oteng (until 12 December 2009)
Kit Manager	Will Jones (from 13 December 2009)

== Reserves and academy ==
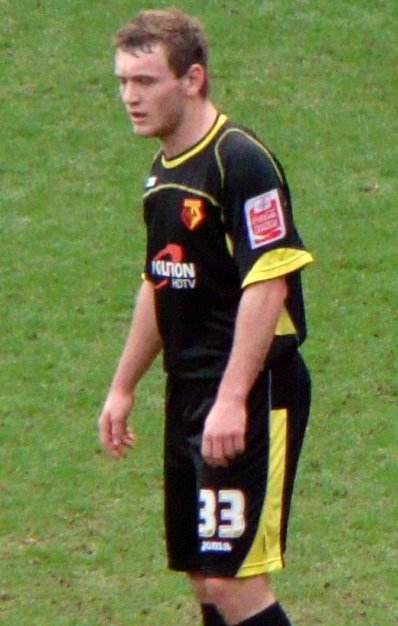
Former academy player Lee Hodson

Watford's reserves competed in the Football Combination East Division, and played their home matches at Boreham Wood's stadium, Meadow Park. Other teams in the league included Watford's historic rivals Luton Town and fellow Hertfordshire side Stevenage Borough. Watford finished the season as champions with 41 points, 8 ahead of nearest challengers Ipswich Town. In the Herts Senior Cup, the reserves were defeated 4–1 in the first round by nearby Hemel Hempstead Town's first team. Piero Mingoia scored Watford's only goal of the competition, which was eventually won by Bishop's Stortford. At the end of the season, Liam Henderson was the team's top scorer with 11 goals, which included 4 in a 9–3 home win against Stevenage. A total of 14 players appeared for both the senior and reserve teams in 2009–10, including Henderson, Lee Hodson, Dale Bennett and Michael Bryan.

Watford's youth system operates in partnership with the Harefield Academy in Hillingdon. First and second year scholars (aged 16–18) are officially attached to Watford, but also undergo a programme of academic and vocational study at the academy. Players aged 16 and below compete for the school team in their respective age groups under the name Harefield Academy, but wear Watford shirts. On occasion, Harefield schoolboys competed for Watford's under-18 side.

"On the last day of the season, 11 of the squad were from the Academy which says a lot about our youth set up."

— Malky Mackay

The club's under-18 side competed in Group B of the Premier Academy League, where they finished in 6th position out of ten teams. They played home matches at Watford's training ground, University College London Athletic Ground in Shenley. Three players featured for both the under-18 and senior teams in 2009–10: defender Eddie Oshodi, midfielder Kurtney Brooks, and striker Gavin Massey. Professional footballer Rob Kiernan also played for the academy; he spent part of the season playing first team football on loan at Scottish Premier League club Kilmarnock. Harefield Academy's under-15 and under-16 sides both won the Schools' Cup; the first time in the history of the competition that a school won the trophy in multiple age groups.

== Supporters ==
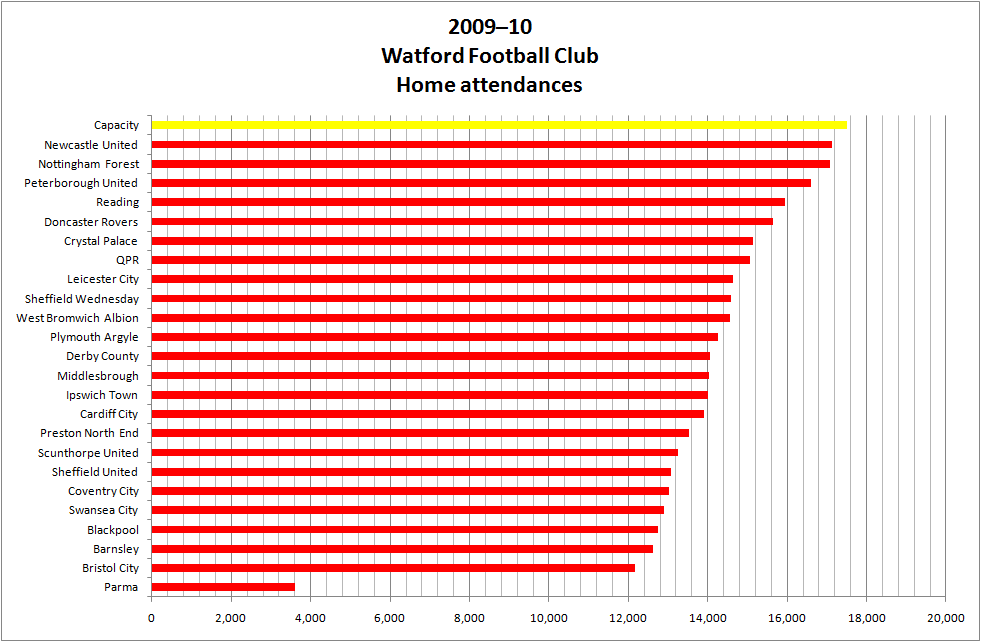

Watford's stadium, Vicarage Road, has a capacity of 17,504. The precise number of season ticket holders has not been stated, but Jimmy Russo revealed in the company's accounts that they numbered approximately 10,000. Visiting clubs received an allocation of 2,300 tickets for their supporters.

The club played 23 competitive home matches in 2009–10, all of them in the Championship, as well as a pre-season friendly match against Parma. Their highest home attendance was 17,120 against Newcastle on Saturday 27 February 2010. The lowest competitive attendance was 12,179 against Bristol City on Tuesday 9 February 2010, while the lowest home attendance overall was 3,598 in the Parma match on Saturday 1 August 2009. Watford's average attendance in competitive matches was 14,344.

Watford played 26 competitive away matches in 2009–10. The match against Newcastle at St James' Park on Saturday 5 December 2009 attracted 43,050 spectators. This was the largest crowd at any Watford match that season, although this was aided in part by the fact that they did not play at another stadium with the capacity to beat it. Another notable away fixture was the match at Madejski Stadium against Reading. Brendan Rodgers, Watford's manager for the second half of 2008–09, left Watford for Reading under controversial circumstances in June, having previously stated that his integrity was being questioned when linked with the managerial vacancy. Reading's matchday squad also featured three former Hornets, two of whom had played for Watford under Rodgers. The match attracted 3,389 Watford fans, and ended in a 1–1 draw, with ex-Watford player Grzegorz Rasiak scoring Reading's goal, and Jobi McAnuff and Brynjar Gunnarsson also playing a part.

== Ownership and finance ==
Watford Football Club is owned by the holding company Watford Leisure Plc (LSE: WFC). Its 2008–09 financial year ran from 1 July 2008 until 30 June 2009. The company released its audited accounts and annual report on 6 November 2009. It included details of the club's major shareholders, showing that Fordwat Limited—the investment company of Michael Ashcroft—owned 37.16% of Watford Leisure, Valley Grown Salads (VGS)—owned by Watford Leisure directors Jimmy and Vince Russo—held a 29.98% stake, and that previous Watford chairman Graham Simpson had a 16.79% share.

"Is this the worst situation I have ever faced in 30 years involvement at Watford? Of course it is. We could go into administration but it doesn't have to happen."

— Graham Taylor, 18 December 2009

The accounts showed an operating loss of £1.465 million, and a net loss of £1.987 million. Throughout 2009, Watford Leisure found themselves in need of finance on several occasions, and were loaned the money by VGS. On 30 November, VGS lent the club a further £1m, taking the total loan to the club to £4.88 million, secured against the club's stadium Vicarage Road. Upon announcing the loan, Watford revealed that this finance would only be sufficient to cover the club's costs until 22 December, and that a further £5.5 million would be needed to keep the business afloat until 30 June 2010.

Watford Leisure's Annual General Meeting was held on 15 December 2009. That meeting began with chairman Jimmy Russo, and fellow directors Vince Russo and Robin Williams resigning from the board. Former Watford manager Graham Taylor was appointed interim chairman. VGS requested immediate repayment of the outstanding loan balance. The club received an offer from Fordwat to underwrite a rights issue worth £7.5m, but revealed that for this plan to work VGS would have to agree to suspend the loan repayment, indicating that they would be placed into administration unless agreement were reached. VGS refused to do so, and Jimmy Russo stated that unless something changed, VGS were left with no option but to begin the process of placing the club in administration. However, administration was avoided when Fordwat paid VGS the money on 21 December 2009, and the club announced two days later that it would borrow money from Elton John's "Playing for Players" concert to fund its running costs until it received the money from the rights issue.
