= Jay DeMerit =

American soccer player (born 1979)

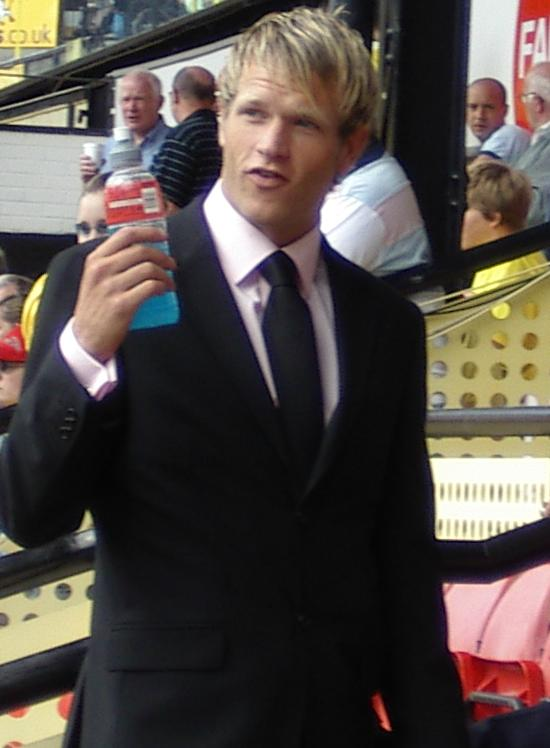
- DeMerit in 2005

Personal information
- Full name: Jay Michael DeMerit
- Date of birth: December 4, 1979 (age 46)
- Place of birth: Green Bay, Wisconsin, U.S.
- Height: 6 ft 1 in (1.85 m)
- Position: Center back

College career
Years	Team	Apps	(Gls)
1998–2001	UIC Flames		

Senior career*
Years	Team	Apps	(Gls)
2001	Chicago Fire Premier		
2003–2004	Southall	2	(0)
2004	Northwood	0	(0)
2004–2010	Watford	182	(9)
2011–2014	Vancouver Whitecaps FC	71	(1)
Total		256	(10)

International career
2007–2011	United States	25	(0)
Medal record
Representing United States
FIFA Confederations Cup
Runner-up	2009 South Africa	Team
CONCACAF Gold Cup
Winner	CONCACAF Gold Cup	2007
Men's Soccer
- * Club domestic league appearances and goals

Jay Michael DeMerit (born December 4, 1979) is an American former soccer player who played as a center back.

He played college soccer for the UIC Flames and was in the Chicago Fire Premier development squad, but after not being drafted for Major League Soccer, he moved to look for a club in England. He played for non-league sides Southall and Northwood before signing for Watford of the Championship in 2004. DeMerit played 213 total games for Watford over six seasons, including one in the 2006–07 Premier League, having scored in their victory in the 2006 Football League Championship play-off final. After his release from Watford, he was the first player signed by the Vancouver Whitecaps FC for their entrance in MLS, where he played four seasons before retiring through injury.

DeMerit was first capped for the United States in March 2007, earning 25 caps up to 2011. He was part of their squads that won the 2007 CONCACAF Gold Cup and came runners-up at the 2009 FIFA Confederations Cup, also featuring at the 2007 Copa América and the 2010 FIFA World Cup.

== Club career ==
=== Early career ===
DeMerit was a three-sport high school athlete in Wisconsin, where he participated in basketball and track in addition to soccer. He attended Bay Port High School and graduated in 1998.

DeMerit played college soccer at the University of Illinois at Chicago, where he moved from playing forward to defender. While in college, DeMerit formed part of a defensive backline that helped lead the team into the NCAA playoffs in 2000. Although he played with Chicago Fire Premier, the development team of the Chicago Fire in the USL Premier Development League, he was not drafted or signed by any Major League Soccer clubs following graduation from college. After spending some time working as a bartender, DeMerit took the advice of a former European teammate and decided to take advantage of his European Union work status (due to his Danish grandfather) by moving to England in 2003 with $1,800, in an attempt to find a club to play for. He started off playing in the ninth tier of English football for Southall, earning only £40 a week.

In July 2004, DeMerit joined Northwood, a seventh-tier side, to play in some of their pre-season matches. Northwood played Watford, then a Football League Championship team, in their second pre-season match. During the course of the match, DeMerit impressed then Watford manager Ray Lewington enough to earn a two-week trial. Following the trial, DeMerit signed a one-year contract with Watford to play in their 2004–05 season.

=== Watford ===
In November, he signed an extension to his contract, keeping him with the club until 2007. He scored his first goal for the club on 15 January 2005, scoring Watford's third in a 3–1 win against Crewe Alexandra by "slamming into the bottom corner from 20 yards".

During the 2005–06 season, Watford was expected to fight relegation from the Championship to League One as they had in DeMerit's first season with the club. However, under new coach Aidy Boothroyd, Watford maintained strong form throughout the season and finished third in the Championship table, earning the right to enter the playoffs for the last of three annual promotion spots to the Premier League. On May 21, 2006, in the play-off final against Leeds United, DeMerit headed in the game's first goal and was named Man of the Match as Watford gained promotion to the Premier League by defeating Leeds United 3–0. Soon afterwards, he joined the ranks of athlete-musicians by releasing a single entitled "Soccer Rocks", available in the club shop.

DeMerit's hard work in the 2005–06 Championship season and his efforts in helping get the club promoted was rewarded with a contract extension taking him through the end of the 2008–09 season as a Watford player. He was named as one of three candidates for Watford's 2006–07 Player of the Season award, which was ultimately won by goalkeeper Ben Foster.

Until the 2007–08 season, DeMerit often filled the role of Watford's vice-captain, behind then-captain Gavin Mahon. He captained Watford for the first time on December 9, 2006, in the home game against Reading, and re-donned the armband on January 6, 2007, for the 4–1 win over Stockport County in the FA Cup third round. On December 15, 2007, it was announced that DeMerit had been named captain, replacing Mahon, whose contract was not being renewed. However, this later proved to be a temporary move, with the captaincy rotating between himself, Danny Shittu, and Richard Lee, before finally being passed to John Eustace, a newly signed central midfielder. In later interviews, DeMerit admitted that this placed strain on his relationship with manager Adrian Boothroyd.

Early in the 2009–10 season, DeMerit suffered a scratch on his eyeball while removing a contact lens. DeMerit's eye became infected, severely obscuring his vision and requiring a corneal transplant in October. He returned to action on December 7, 2009, playing the second half of Watford's 3–1 victory over Queens Park Rangers. DeMerit's contract at Watford expired in June 2010, and was not renewed.

=== Vancouver Whitecaps FC ===
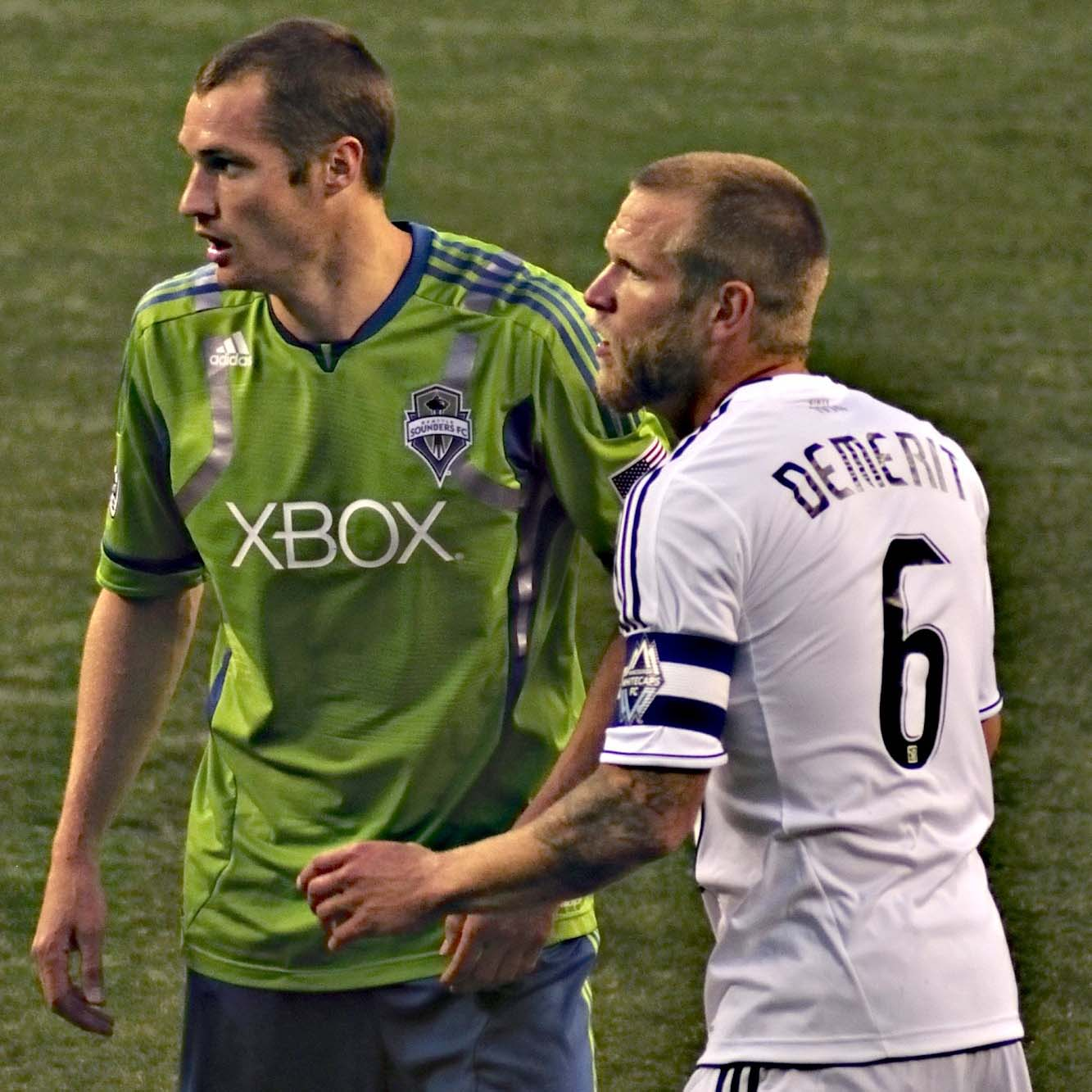
DeMerit (right) defending against Nate Jaqua of the Seattle Sounders FC

On November 18, 2010, DeMerit was announced as the first player signed by Vancouver Whitecaps FC in preparation for their entry into Major League Soccer in 2011. He was also named the captain right before the season started. During the 2011 Major League Soccer season, DeMerit was out for a considerable amount of the season and the Whitecaps ended up finishing last in the league. In 2012, DeMerit was healthy the whole year and led the team to a decent finish. DeMerit was even named an MLS All-Star and played against Chelsea in the 2012 MLS All-Star Game. The MLS All-Stars won 3–2 against Chelsea.

In July 2014, DeMerit announced his retirement after a series of injuries.

== International career ==
DeMerit earned his first cap for the United States national team on March 28, 2007, starting in a friendly against Guatemala. He was a member of the U.S. Men's National Team that won the 2007 CONCACAF Gold Cup, thus qualifying for the 2009 FIFA Confederations Cup.

In the 2009 Confederations Cup, DeMerit started at center back due to Carlos Bocanegra's hamstring injury. He played the entire game when the U.S. Men's National Team defeated Spain in the semi-final 2–0 on June 24, 2009. The Barcelona sports daily El Mundo Deportivo called DeMerit's play "superb". DeMerit also played the entire match when the USMNT lost 3–2 to Brazil in the Cup final on June 28, 2009.

For the 2010 FIFA World Cup in South Africa, he made Bob Bradley's 23-man squad, and started all four of the United States matches – the three first-round games, against England, Slovenia, and Algeria, and the second round match against Ghana, in which the U.S. Men's National Team were eliminated. During the Algeria match he played most of the game with a split tongue that required five stitches after the game.

Despite his success in the World Cup squad and with Vancouver, he was not recalled to the national team under Bradley's successor Jürgen Klinsmann.

== Personal life ==
His career is the subject of the 2011 independent film, Rise and Shine: The Jay DeMerit Story, based on his rise from the ninth tier of soccer in England to the Premier League and FIFA World Cup.

In 2013, he married Canadian freestyle skier and Olympic gold medalist, Ashleigh McIvor. The couple would have a son together, Oakes, and would later separate but continued to co-parent their child.

== Career statistics ==
=== Club ===
As of match played 24 July 2014

Appearances and goals by club, season and competition
Club	Season	League			National cup (Note: Includes FA Cup, Voyageurs Cup)		League cup (Note: Includes Football League Cup/EFL Cup)		Other		Total	
Club	Season	Division	Apps	Goals	Apps	Goals	Apps	Goals	Apps	Goals	Apps	Goals
Northwood	2004-05	Isthmian League	0	0	0	0	—		0	0	0	0
Watford	2004–05	Championship	24	3	2	0	6	0	0	0	32	3
Watford	2005–06	Championship	32	2	0	0	2	0	3 (Note: Appearance(s) in Championship play-offs)	1	37	3
Watford	2006–07	Premier League	32	2	5	0	2	0	—		39	2
Watford	2007–08	Championship	35	1	2	0	0	0	2 (Note: Appearance(s) in Championship play-offs)	0	39	1
Watford	2008–09	Championship	32	0	3	1	3	0	—		38	1
Watford	2009–10	Championship	27	0	1	0	0	0	—		28	0
Watford	Total		182	8	13	1	13	0	5	1	213	10
Vancouver Whitecaps	2011	Major League Soccer	21	0	2	0	—		—		23	0
Vancouver Whitecaps	2012	Major League Soccer	31	1	2	0	—		—		31	1
Vancouver Whitecaps	2013	Major League Soccer	8	0	0	0	—		—		8	0
Vancouver Whitecaps	2014	Major League Soccer	11	0	0	0	—		—		11	0
Vancouver Whitecaps	Total		71	1	2	0	—		—		73	1
Career total			253	9	15	1	13	0	5	1	286	11

=== International ===
National team	Year	Apps	Goals
United States
United States	2007	6	0
United States	2008	3	0
United States	2009	7	0
United States	2010	7	0
United States	2011	2	0
Total		25	0

== Honors ==
Watford

- Football League Championship play-offs: 2006

United States

- CONCACAF Gold Cup: 2007

== See also ==
- Junior Messias - another football player who made semi-professional career lately and made progress from semi-professional to world class.
