= Malky Mackay =

Scottish footballer and manager

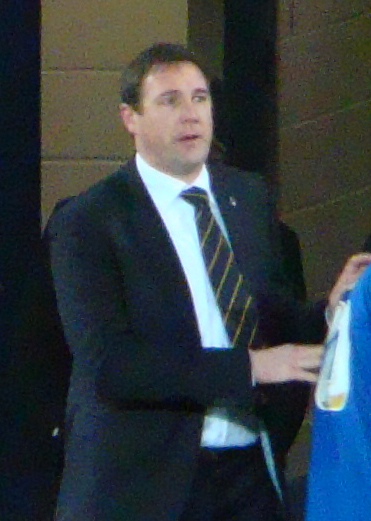
- Mackay as manager of Cardiff City in 2012

Personal information
- Full name: Malcolm George Mackay
- Date of birth: 19 February 1972 (age 54)
- Place of birth: Bellshill, Scotland
- Height: 6 ft 2 in (1.88 m)
- Position: Defender

Team information
- Current team: Hibernian (sporting director)

Youth career
- Queen's Park

Senior career*
Years	Team	Apps	(Gls)
1990–1993	Queen's Park	70	(6)
1993–1998	Celtic	34	(4)
1998	→ Norwich City (loan)	1	(0)
1998–2004	Norwich City	212	(15)
2004–2005	West Ham United	18	(2)
2005–2008	Watford	52	(3)
Total		387	(30)

International career
2004	Scotland	5	(0)

Managerial career
- 2008: Watford (caretaker)
- 2009–2011: Watford
- 2011–2013: Cardiff City
- 2014–2015: Wigan Athletic
- 2017–2018: Scotland (caretaker)
- 2021–2023: Ross County
- * Club domestic league appearances and goals

Malcolm George Mackay (born 19 February 1972) is a Scottish professional football coach and former player, who is the sporting director at Scottish Premiership club Hibernian.

Mackay, who played as a defender, began his playing career in Scottish football with Queen's Park and Celtic. He joined English side Norwich City in 1998, remaining there for six years. Between 2004 and 2006, he achieved consecutive promotions to the Premier League with Norwich, West Ham United and finally Watford. Mackay won five caps for Scotland towards the end of his playing career.

After retiring as a player in 2008, he became manager of Watford in June 2009. He was manager of Cardiff City between June 2011 and December 2013, achieving promotion to the Premier League in 2013 but was dismissed after a dispute with club owner Vincent Tan. Mackay was appointed manager of Wigan Athletic in November 2014, and was dismissed the following April. After a spell working for the Scottish Football Association, he was appointed Ross County manager in May 2021.

== Playing career ==
=== Early career ===
Born in Bellshill, Mackay began his career in his native Scotland, coming through the youth ranks of Queen's Park, before joining Celtic in the summer of 1993. He made his Celtic debut on 13 May 1995 in a 1–0 away win against Dundee United.

His first Celtic goal was scored on 27 April 1996 in a 4–2 away win against Partick Thistle. He made 46 appearances in five years with the Glasgow club, and in September 1998 moved to England, joining Norwich City for a fee of £350,000 after a one-game loan spell.

=== Norwich City ===
At the end of the 2001–02 season Norwich fans voted Mackay in second place behind Gary Holt in the voting for Norwich City player of the year. In the 2003–04 season, his sixth at Norwich, the club was promoted to the Premier League after winning the then Division One, however he was released by Norwich at the end of the season. He was named in the Football League First Division Team of the Year in the 2003–04 in which they got promoted. Mackay scored a brace for Norwich in an East Anglian derby against Ipswich Town.

=== West Ham United ===
Mackay was signed for West Ham United by manager Alan Pardew, for £300,000, on 10 September 2004. He played 18 league games for the Hammers, although none after March, as West Ham reached the play-offs, beating Preston North End in the final to reach the Premier League. Mackay was released before playing a top flight game.

=== Watford ===
Mackay was picked up on a free transfer by Aidy Boothroyd as part of his rebuilding of Watford and soon become one of the key figures in Boothroyd's side. Mackay was involved in some excellent defensive displays as well as scoring some vital goals, including one against fierce rivals Luton Town at Kenilworth Road in a 2–1 victory. At the end of the 2005–06 season Mackay achieved the feat of being promoted to the Premier League for the third successive season, as Watford defeated Leeds United 3–0 in the play-off final.

After having been released following his two previous promotion campaigns, Mackay was assured by Boothroyd that he would play a part in Watford's Premier League campaign, citing his experience as an important asset to the team. Although he was not a first-team regular, Mackay made 14 Premier League appearances in 2006–07. In January 2007, Mackay took his first step into coaching by being promoted to first team coach, following the departure of Dave Hockaday.

In the 2007–08 season Mackay's only first team appearance came during an FA Cup match against Wolves in January 2008. He took over as caretaker manager at Watford on 4 November 2008 following the departure of Aidy Boothroyd.

=== International career ===
During his sixth and final season at Norwich, at the age of 32, Mackay became the oldest man to make his debut for Scotland in 37 years.

It came in a 1–0 defeat to Denmark; Mackay later played in a 1–0 victory over Estonia and a 4–1 win against Trinidad & Tobago. In total, Mackay won five caps for Scotland.

== Coaching career ==
=== Watford ===
After Brendan Rodgers resigned in June 2009, Mackay took over as the manager of Watford. Watford drew 1–1 on their league visit to Reading on 26 September 2009, and by their second meeting late in the season Rodgers had been dismissed by Reading after only a few months in charge. As for Mackay and Watford, 2009–10 was a difficult season where their Championship status was under threat for a long time, but by the end of April survival had been achieved against Reading, ending the season 14th place in the league.

=== Cardiff City ===
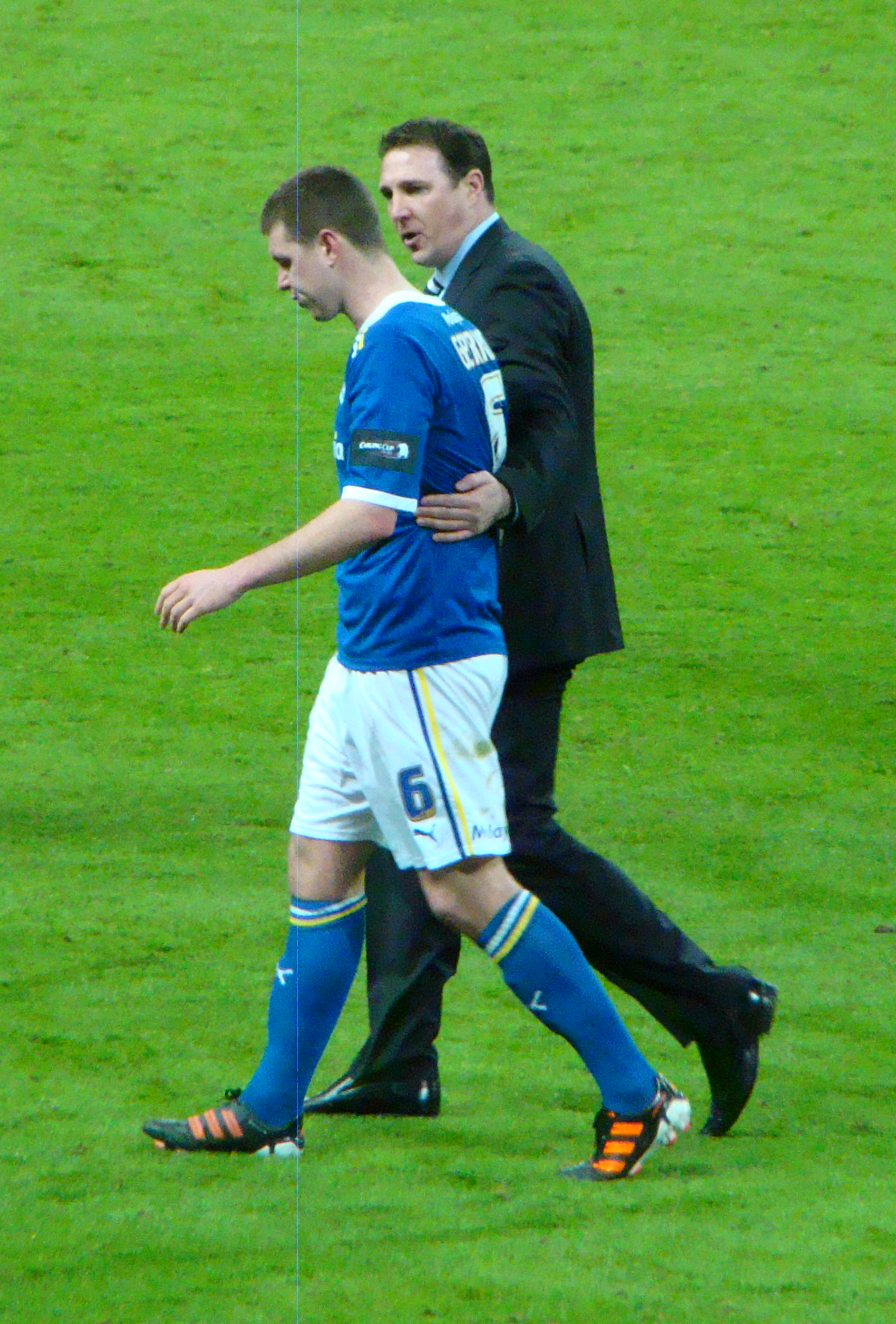
Mackay (right) after Cardiff City were beaten in the 2012 League Cup Final

Mackay signed a three-year contract as Cardiff City manager on 17 June 2011, with Watford receiving an undisclosed fee in compensation. His reign began with a 1–0 away win over West Ham United. The side were undefeated in September, resulting in Mackay being nominated for the September Championship Manager of the Month in his first month managing the Welsh club. Another unbeaten month for Cardiff resulted in Mackay winning the award in November.

He guided Cardiff to their first ever League Cup final, following wins over Oxford United, Huddersfield Town, Leicester City, Burnley, Blackburn Rovers and Crystal Palace in earlier rounds.

The week before the League Cup final, Mackay signed a three-and-a-half-year contract extension, tying him to the club until June 2016. Mackay's side were beaten by Liverpool in the Wembley final, losing 3–2 on penalties, with a 2–2 scoreline after extra time. Cardiff's season ended where it began, as they were beaten 5–0 on aggregate by West Ham United in the promotion playoffs.

Following the success of his first season in Wales, Mackay was reportedly one of the candidates to replace Paul Lambert at Premier League side Norwich City. He turned down the offer and said he was fully committed to Cardiff City. He oversaw Cardiff's strongest ever home start to a league season, as they won each of their first ten fixtures at Cardiff City Stadium, the previous club record being nine consecutive home wins. Mackay went on to lead Cardiff to promotion to the Premier League, and sealed the Championship title after a 1–1 draw away at Burnley. Mackay was voted the League Managers Association (LMA) Championship Manager of the Year on 21 May 2013.

During the 2013–14 season, Mackay came under criticism from club owner Vincent Tan concerning his signings, transfer budgets, results and style of play. In December 2013, Tan told Mackay to resign from the club or be dismissed. After a 3–0 home defeat to Southampton, Mackay was sacked by Cardiff on 27 December 2013 after a meeting with the club's directors.

=== Wigan Athletic ===
Mackay was appointed manager of Wigan Athletic on 19 November 2014, despite fan opposition, after the Championship side had dismissed Uwe Rösler. The appointment was criticised by the Kick It Out campaign, who said that the club had disregarded the ongoing FA investigation into text messages sent by Mackay. Wigan chairman Dave Whelan said that the club had inserted a clause in its contract with Mackay stating that they could terminate the contract if he was found guilty by the FA. A shirt sponsor of the club, Premier Range, withdrew their backing after Mackay was appointed.

On 22 November, in his first game as manager, Wigan drew 1–1 against Middlesbrough at the DW Stadium. He was dismissed on 6 April 2015, after a 0–2 defeat to Derby County left the club eight points from safety of relegation in the division. During his 138-day tenure, Wigan achieved 19 points from a possible 72, winning 5 games of 24 played in the Championship. The move was welcomed by fans with Wigan Athletic Supporters Club spokesperson Caroline Molyneux telling BBC Sport: "I think [Mackay's sacking] is a popular decision among the fans." Mackay had received public backing by newly appointed club chairman David Sharpe as recently as March 2015 when he described Mackay as "a big part of what we are doing here".

=== Scottish Football Association ===
In December 2016, the Scottish Football Association (Scottish FA) appointed Mackay as its performance director, responsible for overseeing the development of young players. The appointment was criticised by some people, including politician Clare Haughey, due to Mackay's previous behaviour. The anti-racism campaign group Kick It Out made comments that were supportive of Mackay, pointing out that he had since received equality and diversity training from the (English) FA.

During his tenure with the SFA, Mackay was appointed caretaker manager of the Scotland national team. He gave four players debuts in his only match, which the team lost 1–0 to the Netherlands in a friendly at Pittodrie on 9 November 2017. Mackay resigned from his position as performance director in November 2020.

=== Ross County ===
Mackay was appointed manager of Ross County in May 2021. The move was once again met with fan backlash as a section of Ross County fans criticised the club's decision to appoint Mackay as manager. In his first season as manager, County finished in sixth position in the Scottish Premiership despite being favourites for relegation. They fell to an 11th-place finish in 2022–23, and avoided relegation by winning a play-off against Partick Thistle on penalties. Mackay was sacked by County on 15 November 2023, with the team on a nine-game winless run and sitting in 11th place in the Premiership table.

=== Hibernian ===
On 14 May 2024, Hibernian announced that they had appointed Mackay to a sporting director role. The news came on the same day as the sacking of head coach Nick Montgomery, with the club saying that Mackay would lead the process for appointing his replacement.

== Controversies ==
Mackay was expected to become manager of Premier League club Crystal Palace in August 2014, but dropped out of contention after Cardiff City sent a dossier to the Football Association alleging misconduct by Mackay and sporting director Iain Moody. It subsequently emerged that some of the allegations related to text messages considered to be racist, sexist and homophobic in nature. Cardiff questioned the fees paid to agents and lawyers relating to transfer deals made while Mackay and Moody worked for the club. A source of tension between the two clubs was the alleged leaking in April 2014 of a Cardiff starting line-up to Crystal Palace, where Moody had become sporting director after leaving Cardiff. Moody resigned from his position at Palace after the allegations were publicised.

Via a statement published by the LMA, Mackay apologised for writing two messages that he admitted were disrespectful of other cultures, but denied stating anything of a homophobic or sexist nature. The LMA itself apologised for characterising the messages as "friendly banter" in the statement. After conducting an investigation, the Football Association announced in July 2015 that it would not charge Mackay or Moody with any offences.

== Personal life ==
Mackay's father (also named Malky Mackay) is a former footballer who played as a striker. The Mackay family are all supporters of Glasgow-based club Queen's Park. Mackay Sr. is a member of the board at the club. Mackay Jr. played for amateur side Queen's Park as a teenager, whilst working in a branch of the Bank of Scotland.

== Managerial statistics ==
As of match played 11 November 2023

Managerial record by team and tenure
Team	From	To	Record					Ref
Team	From	To	P	W	D	L	Win %	Ref
Watford (caretaker)	4 November 2008	26 November 2008	5	2	1	2	40.0	
Watford	15 June 2009	17 June 2011	99	33	25	41	33.3	
Cardiff City	17 June 2011	27 December 2013	125	54	37	34	43.2	
Wigan Athletic	19 November 2014	6 April 2015	25	5	4	16	20.0	
Scotland (caretaker)	13 October 2017	16 February 2018	1	0	0	1	0.0	
Ross County	26 May 2021	15 November 2023	107	31	25	51	29.0	
Total			362	125	92	145	34.5	—

== Honours ==
=== Player ===
Celtic

- Scottish Premier Division: 1997–98

Norwich City

- Football League First Division: 2003–04

Watford

- Football League Championship play-offs: 2006

Individual

- PFA Team of the Year: 2003–04 First Division

=== Manager ===
Cardiff City

- Football League Championship: 2012–13
- Football League Cup runner-up: 2011–12

Ross County

- Scottish Premiership play-offs: 2022–23

Individual

- Football League Championship Manager of the Month: March 2011, November 2011
- League Managers Association Championship Manager of the Year: 2012–13
