= List of English football transfers winter 2011–12 =

The 2011–12 winter transfer window for English football transfers opened on 1 January and closed on 31 January 2012. Additionally, players without a club could join at any time, clubs below Premier League level could sign players on loan at any time, and clubs could sign a goalkeeper on an emergency loan if they had no registered goalkeeper available. This list includes transfers featuring at least one Premier League or Championship club which were completed after the end of the summer 2011 transfer window and before the end of the 2011–12 winter window.

== Transfers ==
Date	Name	Moving from	Moving to	Fee
1 September 2011	Jason Puncheon	Southampton	Queens Park Rangers	Loan
1 September 2011	Jordan Slew	Sheffield United	Blackburn Rovers	£1.1m
1 September 2011	(Sweden) Muamer Tankovic	(Sweden) Norrköping	Fulham	Undisclosed
2 September 2011	(Spain) Vicente	Unattached	Brighton & Hove Albion	Free
5 September 2011	(Nigeria) Joseph Yobo	Everton	(Turkey) Fenerbahçe	Loan
7 September 2011	Antonio Pedroza	(Mexico) Chiapas	Crystal Palace	Undisclosed
8 September 2011	Blair Adams	Sunderland	Brentford	Loan
8 September 2011	Jack Butland	Birmingham City	Cheltenham Town	Loan
8 September 2011	(Finland) Mikael Forssell	Unattached	Leeds United	Free
8 September 2011	Scott Griffiths	Peterborough United	Crawley Town	Loan
8 September 2011	(Spain) Miguel Llera	Blackpool	Brentford	Loan
8 September 2011	Lewis Stockford	Portsmouth	Salisbury City	Loan
8 September 2011	Jak Alnwick	Newcastle United	Gateshead	Loan
9 September 2011	Ben Alnwick	Tottenham Hotspur	Leyton Orient	Loan
9 September 2011	Tom Clarke	Huddersfield Town	Leyton Orient	Loan
9 September 2011	(Wales) Danny Collins	Stoke City	Ipswich Town	Loan
9 September 2011	(Wales) Nathaniel Jarvis	(Wales) Cardiff City	(Wales) Newport County	Loan
9 September 2011	Sam Johnstone	Manchester United	Scunthorpe United	Loan
9 September 2011	(Jamaica) Kevin Lisbie	Ipswich Town	Leyton Orient	Undisclosed
9 September 2011	Callum McNaughton	West Ham United	AFC Wimbledon	Loan
10 September 2011	(Ghana) Asamoah Gyan	Sunderland	(United Arab Emirates) Al Ain	Loan
12 September 2011	(Northern Ireland) Trevor Carson	Sunderland	Bury	Loan
12 September 2011	Robert Hall	West Ham United	Oxford United	Loan
12 September 2011	Gavin Massey	Watford	Yeovil Town	Loan
13 September 2011	Marlon Jackson	Bristol City	Northampton Town	Loan
13 September 2011	Dave Martin	Derby County	Walsall	Loan
13 September 2011	(Finland) Mika Väyrynen	Unattached	Leeds United	Free
15 September 2011	(Scotland) David Clarkson	Bristol City	Brentford	Loan
15 September 2011	Andy Drury	Ipswich Town	Crawley Town	Loan
15 September 2011	David McGoldrick	Nottingham Forest	Sheffield Wednesday	Loan
15 September 2011	Frank Nouble	West Ham United	Gillingham	Loan
15 September 2011	Matthew Whichelow	Watford	Exeter City	Loan
16 September 2011	(Croatia) Matej Delač	Chelsea	(Czech Republic) Dynamo České Budějovice	Loan
16 September 2011	Ryan Donaldson	Newcastle United	Tranmere Rovers	Loan
16 September 2011	Alex Nimely	Manchester City	Middlesbrough	Loan
16 September 2011	Adam Smith	Leicester City	Chesterfield	Loan
20 September 2011	Stephen Bywater	Derby County	Sheffield Wednesday	Loan
21 September 2011	(Democratic Republic of the Congo) Cédric Baseya	Unattached	Reading	Free
21 September 2011	Clint Hill	Queens Park Rangers	Nottingham Forest	Loan
21 September 2011	Jon Parkin	(Wales) Cardiff City	Doncaster Rovers	Loan
21 September 2011	(Wales) Jake Taylor	Reading	Exeter City	Loan
22 September 2011	Nicky Ajose	Peterborough United	Scunthorpe United	Loan
22 September 2011	(Canada) Jamie Peters	Ipswich Town	Bournemouth	Loan
22 September 2011	Danny Pugh	Stoke City	Leeds United	Loan
23 September 2011	David Amoo	Liverpool	Bury	Loan
23 September 2011	Jose Baxter	Everton	Tranmere Rovers	Loan
23 September 2011	Andrew Davies	Stoke City	Bradford City	Loan
23 September 2011	(United States) Marcus Hahnemann	Unattached	Everton	Free
23 September 2011	Mark Howard	Unattached	Blackpool	Free
23 September 2011	Oliver Norburn	Leicester City	Bristol Rovers	Loan
23 September 2011	Elliot Parish	Aston Villa	(Wales) Cardiff City	Loan
26 September 2011	Brian Howard	Reading	Millwall	Loan
26 September 2011	(Norway) Bjørn Helge Riise	Fulham	Portsmouth	Loan
26 September 2011	(Republic of Ireland) Martin Rowlands	Queens Park Rangers	Wycombe Wanderers	Loan
28 September 2011	(France) Pascal Chimbonda	Unattached	Doncaster Rovers	Free
29 September 2011	(Portugal) Bruno Andrade	Queens Park Rangers	Burton Albion	Loan
29 September 2011	Luke Garbutt	Everton	Cheltenham Town	Loan
29 September 2011	Troy Hewitt	Queens Park Rangers	Dagenham & Redbridge	Loan
29 September 2011	Jake Jervis	Birmingham City	Swindon Town	Loan
30 September 2011	(Spain) Manuel Almunia	Arsenal	West Ham United	Loan
30 September 2011	Jason Banton	Leicester City	Burton Albion	Loan
30 September 2011	Gary Borrowdale	Queens Park Rangers	Barnet	Loan
30 September 2011	Tom Kennedy	Leicester City	Peterborough United	Loan
30 September 2011	Matt Oakley	Leicester City	Exeter City	Loan
30 September 2011	Jonjo Shelvey	Liverpool	Blackpool	Loan
30 September 2011	Reece Wabara	Manchester City	Ipswich Town	Loan
4 October 2011	(Democratic Republic of the Congo) Hérita Ilunga	West Ham United	Doncaster Rovers	Loan
4 October 2011	James Spray	Wolverhampton Wanderers	Accrington Stanley	Loan
6 October 2011	Jeff Henderson	Newcastle United	Gateshead	Loan
11 October 2011	Michael Kightly	Wolverhampton Wanderers	Watford	Loan
13 October 2011	(Ghana) Patrick Agyemang	Queens Park Rangers	Millwall	Loan
13 October 2011	Chris Kirkland	Wigan Athletic	Doncaster Rovers	Loan
13 October 2011	(Democratic Republic of the Congo) Lomana LuaLua	Unattached	Blackpool	Free
13 October 2011	(Colombia) Cristian Montaño	West Ham United	Swindon Town	Loan
14 October 2011	(Republic of Ireland) Billy Clarke	Blackpool	Sheffield United	Loan
14 October 2011	Wes Foderingham	Crystal Palace	Swindon Town	Loan
14 October 2011	(France) Jérémy Hélan	Manchester City	Carlisle United	Loan
14 October 2011	Matt Phillips	Blackpool	Sheffield United	Loan
14 October 2011	(Czech Republic) Marek Štěch	West Ham United	Yeovil Town	Loan
17 October 2011	(Scotland) James McFadden	Unattached	Everton	Free
17 October 2011	Callum McManaman	Wigan Athletic	Blackpool	Loan
17 October 2011	(Nigeria) Bartholomew Ogbeche	Unattached	Middlesbrough	Free
20 October 2011	Saido Berahino	West Bromwich Albion	Northampton Town	Loan
20 October 2011	Femi Orenuga	Everton	Notts County	Loan
21 October 2011	Darren Purse	Millwall	Yeovil Town	Loan
21 October 2011	(Chile) Gonzalo Jara	West Bromwich Albion	Brighton & Hove Albion	Loan
24 October 2011	(Scotland) Craig Beattie	(Wales) Swansea City	Watford	Loan
24 October 2011	Steve Harper	Newcastle United	Brighton & Hove Albion	Loan
25 October 2011	Nicholas Bignall	Reading	Wycombe Wanderers	Loan
25 October 2011	(Republic of Ireland) Greg Cunningham	Manchester City	Nottingham Forest	Loan
25 October 2011	Luke Daniels	West Bromwich Albion	Southend United	Loan
27 October 2011	Dale Bennett	Watford	Brentford	Loan
27 October 2011	Billy Paynter	Leeds United	Brighton & Hove Albion	Loan
28 October 2011	(Jamaica) Nyron Nosworthy	Sunderland	Watford	Loan
28 October 2011	(Ivory Coast) Abdul Razak	Manchester City	Portsmouth	Loan
28 October 2011	Mark Wilson	Doncaster Rovers	Walsall	Loan
31 October 2011	(Senegal) El-Hadji Diouf	Unattached	Doncaster Rovers	Free
31 October 2011	Micah Evans	Blackburn Rovers	Accrington Stanley	Loan
2 November 2011	(Wales) Richard Peniket	Fulham	Hereford United	Loan
2 November 2011	(Wales) Christian Ribeiro	Bristol City	Carlisle United	Loan
3 November 2011	Paul Downing	West Bromwich Albion	Barnet	Loan
3 November 2011	Michael Hector	Reading	Barnet	Loan
3 November 2011	(Italy) Andrea Mancini	Manchester City	Oldham Athletic	Loan
3 November 2011	(Italy) Luca Scapuzzi	Manchester City	Oldham Athletic	Loan
3 November 2011	(Sweden) Ole Söderberg	Newcastle United	Chesterfield	Loan
3 November 2011	James Wallace	Everton	Shrewsbury Town	Loan
4 November 2011	Paul Bignot	Blackpool	Plymouth Argyle	Loan
4 November 2011	(Republic of Ireland) Conor Clifford	Chelsea	Yeovil Town	Loan
4 November 2011	Alex McCarthy	Reading	Leeds United	Loan
4 November 2011	(Scotland) Stephen Pearson	Derby County	Bristol City	Loan
4 November 2011	(Wales) Casey Thomas	(Wales) Swansea City	Colchester United	Loan
7 November 2011	Jack Saville	Southampton	Barnet	Loan
8 November 2011	(Barbados) Jonathan Forte	Southampton	Preston North End	Loan
8 November 2011	Sam Hoskins	Southampton	Preston North End	Loan
8 November 2011	Tope Obadeyi	Bolton Wanderers	Chesterfield	Loan
8 November 2011	Aaron Wildig	(Wales) Cardiff City	Shrewsbury Town	Loan
9 November 2011	(Wales) Andy Dorman	Crystal Palace	Bristol Rovers	Loan
9 November 2011	(Bulgaria) Dimitar Evtimov	Nottingham Forest	Gainsborough Trinity	Loan
10 November 2011	(Nigeria) Carl Ikeme	Wolverhampton Wanderers	Doncaster Rovers	Loan
11 November 2011	Mark Halstead	Blackpool	Stockport County	Loan
15 November 2011	Hogan Ephraim	Queens Park Rangers	Charlton Athletic	Loan
15 November 2011	Chris Martin	Norwich City	Crystal Palace	Loan
15 November 2011	Tom Naylor	Mansfield Town	Derby County	Loan
15 November 2011	Jemal Wiseman	Coventry City	Nuneaton Town	Loan
15 November 2011	Josh Wright	Unattached	Millwall	Free
16 November 2011	Robert Hall	West Ham United	Oxford United	Loan
16 November 2011	(Scotland) Craig Sutherland	Blackpool	Plymouth Argyle	Loan
17 November 2011	(Netherlands) Roland Bergkamp	Brighton & Hove Albion	Rochdale	Loan
17 November 2011	Luke Freeman	Arsenal	Stevenage	Loan
17 November 2011	(Colombia) Cristian Montaño	West Ham United	Dagenham & Redbridge	Loan
17 November 2011	Seyi Ojo	Milton Keynes Dons	Liverpool	Undisclosed
18 November 2011	James Hurst	West Bromwich Albion	Shrewsbury Town	Loan
18 November 2011	(Wales) Sam Vokes	Wolverhampton Wanderers	Burnley	Loan
19 November 2011	Nile Ranger	Newcastle United	Barnsley	Loan
21 November 2011	(Senegal) Habib Beye	Aston Villa	Doncaster Rovers	Loan
21 November 2011	(Israel) Dekel Keinan	(Wales) Cardiff City	Crystal Palace	Loan
21 November 2011	(Democratic Republic of the Congo) Kazenga LuaLua	Newcastle United	Brighton & Hove Albion	Undisclosed
21 November 2011	James Tavernier	Newcastle United	Sheffield Wednesday	Loan
22 November 2011	Nathan Baker	Aston Villa	Millwall	Loan
22 November 2011	(Spain) Miguel Llera	Blackpool	Sheffield Wednesday	Loan
23 November 2011	(France) Hérold Goulon	Blackburn Rovers	Doncaster Rovers	Loan
23 November 2011	(Australia) Shane Lowry	Aston Villa	Millwall	Loan
23 November 2011	Sanchez Watt	Arsenal	Sheffield Wednesday	Loan
24 November 2011	(Democratic Republic of the Congo) Cédric Baseya	Reading	Barnet	Loan
24 November 2011	Jake Bidwell	Everton	Brentford	Loan
24 November 2011	(Northern Ireland) Alex Bruce	Leeds United	Huddersfield Town	Loan
24 November 2011	Tony Craig	Millwall	Leyton Orient	Loan
24 November 2011	Harlee Dean	Southampton	Brentford	Loan
24 November 2011	Nathan Doyle	Barnsley	Preston North End	Loan
24 November 2011	Wes Fletcher	Burnley	Crewe Alexandra	Loan
24 November 2011	(France) Marc-Antoine Fortuné	West Bromwich Albion	Doncaster Rovers	Loan
24 November 2011	Gary Gardner	Aston Villa	Coventry City	Loan
24 November 2011	(Republic of Ireland) Rene Gilmartin	Watford	Yeovil Town	Loan
24 November 2011	Chris Hackett	Millwall	Exeter City	Loan
24 November 2011	(Scotland) Andy Halliday	Middlesbrough	Walsall	Loan
24 November 2011	Ashley Hemmings	Wolverhampton Wanderers	Plymouth Argyle	Loan
24 November 2011	Marlon Jackson	Bristol City	Cheltenham Town	Loan
24 November 2011	Joe Mattock	West Bromwich Albion	Portsmouth	Loan
24 November 2011	(Republic of Ireland) Shane O'Connor	Ipswich Town	Port Vale	Loan
24 November 2011	(Hungary) Tamás Priskin	Ipswich Town	Derby County	Loan
24 November 2011	Darren Purse	Millwall	Plymouth Argyle	Loan
24 November 2011	Paul Rachubka	Leeds United	Tranmere Rovers	Loan
24 November 2011	Bobby Reid	Bristol City	Cheltenham Town	Loan
24 November 2011	(Northern Ireland) Maik Taylor	Unattached	Leeds United	Free
24 November 2011	George Thorne	West Bromwich Albion	Portsmouth	Loan
24 November 2011	(Italy) Marcello Trotta	Fulham	Wycombe Wanderers	Loan
25 November 2011	Chris Chantler	Manchester City	Carlisle United	Loan
25 November 2011	Adam Reach	Middlesbrough	Darlington	Loan
1 December 2011	(Netherlands) Jos Hooiveld	(Scotland) Celtic	Southampton	Undisclosed
1 December 2011	Solomon March	Lewes	Brighton & Hove Albion	Free
7 December 2011	(Senegal) Lamine Diatta	Unattached	Doncaster Rovers	Free
15 December 2011	(United States) Landon Donovan	(United States) Major League Soccer (Los Angeles Galaxy)	Everton	Loan
20 December 2011	Jordon Ibe	Wycombe Wanderers	Liverpool	Undisclosed
23 December 2011	Scott Malone	Wolverhampton Wanderers	Bournemouth	Undisclosed
23 December 2011	(Burkina Faso) Habib Bamogo	Unattached	Doncaster Rovers	Free
23 December 2011	(Mali) Mamadou Bagayoko	Unattached	Doncaster Rovers	Free
23 December 2011	(France) Damien Plessis	(Greece) Panathinaikos	Doncaster Rovers	Loan
30 December 2011	(Northern Ireland) Rory Donnelly	(Northern Ireland) Cliftonville	(Wales) Swansea City	Undisclosed
31 December 2011	(Ghana) Mohammed Abu	Manchester City	(Germany) Eintracht Frankfurt	Loan
31 December 2011	(Scotland) Danny Wilson	Liverpool	Blackpool	Loan
31 December 2011	(Ghana) Emmanuel Frimpong	Arsenal	Wolverhampton Wanderers	Loan
1 January 2012	Andros Townsend	Tottenham Hotspur	Leeds United	Loan
1 January 2012	(France) Nicolas Anelka	Chelsea	(China) Shanghai Shenhua	Undisclosed
1 January 2012	Marcus Williams	Reading	Sheffield United	Free
1 January 2012	David Button	Tottenham Hotspur	Doncaster Rovers	Loan
1 January 2012	(Wales) Grant Basey	Peterborough United	Wycombe Wanderers	Undisclosed
1 January 2012	Jake Jervis	Birmingham City	Preston North End	Loan
1 January 2012	Michael Poke	Brighton & Hove Albion	Bristol Rovers	Loan
1 January 2012	Charlie Taylor	Leeds United	Bradford City	Loan
1 January 2012	(Iceland) Eggert Jónsson	(Scotland) Heart of Midlothian	Wolverhampton Wanderers	Undisclosed
2 January 2012	Blair Adams	Sunderland	Northampton Town	Loan
2 January 2012	(Malta) Daniel Bogdanović	Blackpool	Rochdale	Loan
2 January 2012	Harry Bunn	Manchester City	Preston North End	Loan
2 January 2012	Stephen Bywater	Derby County	Sheffield Wednesday	Free
2 January 2012	(Hungary) Péter Kurucz	West Ham United	Rochdale	Loan
2 January 2012	(Italy) Federico Macheda	Manchester United	Queens Park Rangers	Loan
2 January 2012	Tom Naylor	Mansfield Town	Derby County	Undisclosed
2 January 2012	(Iceland) Gylfi Sigurðsson	(Germany) 1899 Hoffenheim	(Wales) Swansea City	Loan
2 January 2012	(Wales) Rhys Taylor	Chelsea	Rotherham United	Loan
3 January 2012	Steve Cook	Brighton & Hove Albion	Bournemouth	Undisclosed
3 January 2012	Brett Ormerod	Blackpool	Rochdale	Loan
3 January 2012	Elliot Parish	Aston Villa	(Wales) Cardiff City	Undisclosed
3 January 2012	Danny Pugh	Stoke City	Leeds United	Undisclosed
3 January 2012	Kieran Trippier	Manchester City	Burnley	Undisclosed
4 January 2012	(Italy) Vito Mannone	Arsenal	Hull City	Loan
4 January 2012	(Scotland) Sam McMahon	(Scotland) Rangers	Doncaster Rovers	Free
4 January 2012	Dave Martin	Derby County	Southend United	Undisclosed
5 January 2012	Callum Driver	West Ham United	Burton Albion	Loan
5 January 2012	Mustapha Dumbuya	Doncaster Rovers	Crystal Palace	Loan
5 January 2012	(Republic of Ireland) John Egan	Sunderland	Crystal Palace	Loan
5 January 2012	Joe Mattock	West Bromwich Albion	Portsmouth	Loan
5 January 2012	Piero Mingoia	Watford	Brentford	Loan
5 January 2012	(Democratic Republic of the Congo) Aristote Nsiala	Everton	Accrington Stanley	Loan
5 January 2012	Darren Purse	Millwall	Plymouth Argyle	Free
5 January 2012	(Jamaica) Damion Stewart	Bristol City	Notts County	Loan
6 January 2012	(Saudi Arabia) Ahmed Abdulla	West Ham United	Dagenham & Redbridge	Loan
6 January 2012	Sonny Bradley	Hull City	Aldershot Town	Loan
6 January 2012	Chris Chantler	Manchester City	Carlisle United	Undisclosed
6 January 2012	John Cofie	Manchester United	(Belgium) Royal Antwerp	Loan
6 January 2012	Chris Dagnall	Scunthorpe United	Barnsley	Undisclosed
6 January 2012	Ryan Dickson	Southampton	Yeovil Town	Loan
6 January 2012	Wes Foderingham	Crystal Palace	Swindon Town	Undisclosed
6 January 2012	(Scotland) Richard Foster	(Scotland) Aberdeen	Bristol City	Undisclosed
6 January 2012	(France) Thierry Henry	(United States) Major League Soccer (New York Red Bulls)	Arsenal	Loan
6 January 2012	(Scotland) Stephen Pearson	Derby County	Bristol City	Free
6 January 2012	Dan Thompson	Hampton & Richmond Borough	Portsmouth	Free
6 January 2012	(Republic of Ireland) Eoin Wearen	West Ham United	Dagenham & Redbridge	Loan
6 January 2012	Ben Wilson	Sunderland	Gateshead	Loan
7 January 2012	(Norway) Martin Samuelsen	Unattached	Manchester City	Free
8 January 2012	Paul Scholes	Unattached	Manchester United	Free
9 January 2012	(Trinidad and Tobago) Jlloyd Samuel	Bolton Wanderers	(Iran) Esteghlal	Undisclosed
9 January 2012	Alex McCarthy	Reading	Ipswich Town	Loan
9 January 2012	Kern Miller	Barnsley	Hereford United	Loan
9 January 2012	(Scotland) Scott Allan	(Scotland) Dundee United	West Bromwich Albion	Undisclosed
9 January 2012	George Moncur	West Ham United	AFC Wimbledon	Loan
10 January 2012	Luke Freeman	Arsenal	Stevenage	Undisclosed
10 January 2012	Scott Griffiths	Peterborough United	Rotherham United	Loan
10 January 2012	(Spain) Miguel Llera	Blackpool	Sheffield Wednesday	Free
10 January 2012	(Jamaica) Nyron Nosworthy	Sunderland	Watford	Undisclosed
10 January 2012	(France) Darnel Situ	(France) Lens	(Wales) Swansea City	£250k
10 January 2012	James Wallace	Everton	Stevenage	Loan
11 January 2012	Billy Knott	Sunderland	AFC Wimbledon	Loan
11 January 2012	Jack Sampson	Bolton Wanderers	Southend United	Loan
11 January 2012	(Northern Ireland) Dean Shiels	Doncaster Rovers	(Scotland) Kilmarnock	Undisclosed
11 January 2012	James Hurst	West Bromwich Albion	Chesterfield	Loan
11 January 2012	(United States) Robbie Rogers	(United States) Major League Soccer (Columbus Crew)	Leeds United	Undisclosed
11 January 2012	Ben Gordon	Chelsea	(Scotland) Kilmarnock	Loan
11 January 2012	(Wales) Christian Ribeiro	Bristol City	Scunthorpe United	Loan
11 January 2012	(France) Gaël Kakuta	Chelsea	(France) Dijon	Loan
12 January 2012	Joe Edwards	Bristol City	Yeovil Town	Loan
12 January 2012	George Francomb	Norwich City	(Scotland) Hibernian	Loan
12 January 2012	Liam Noble	Sunderland	Carlisle United	Free
12 January 2012	(Republic of Ireland) Robbie Keane	(United States) Major League Soccer (Los Angeles Galaxy)	Aston Villa	Loan
12 January 2012	(Liberia) Alex Nimely	Manchester City	Coventry City	Loan
12 January 2012	(Republic of Ireland) Karl Sheppard	(Republic of Ireland) Shamrock Rovers	Reading	Free
12 January 2012	(New Zealand) Chris Wood	West Bromwich Albion	Bristol City	Loan
13 January 2012	(Northern Ireland) Trevor Carson	Sunderland	Hull City	Loan
13 January 2012	David Davis	Wolverhampton Wanderers	Chesterfield	Loan
13 January 2012	(Wales) Kieron Freeman	Nottingham Forest	Notts County	Loan
13 January 2012	(Republic of Ireland) Darron Gibson	Manchester United	Everton	Undisclosed
13 January 2012	Danny Haynes	Barnsley	Charlton Athletic	Undisclosed
13 January 2012	(United States) George John	(United States) Major League Soccer (FC Dallas)	West Ham United	Loan
13 January 2012	(Republic of Ireland) Paul McShane	Hull City	Crystal Palace	Loan
13 January 2012	Dean Parrett	Tottenham Hotspur	Yeovil Town	Loan
13 January 2012	Josh Walker	Watford	Scunthorpe United	Loan
13 January 2012	Daniel Redmond	Wigan Athletic	(Scotland) Hamilton Academical	Loan
13 January 2012	Adam Dodd	Blackpool	(Scotland) Ayr United	Loan
14 January 2012	Lukas Jutkiewicz	Coventry City	Middlesbrough	Loan
16 January 2012	Gary Cahill	Bolton Wanderers	Chelsea	£7m
16 January 2012	Jordan Cook	Sunderland	Carlisle United	Loan
16 January 2012	(Norway) Joshua King	Manchester United	Hull City	Loan
16 January 2012	(Netherlands) Patrick van Aanholt	Chelsea	(Netherlands) Vitesse Arnhem	Loan
16 January 2012	(Iceland) Hermann Hreiðarsson	Portsmouth	Coventry City	Free
16 January 2012	Louis Laing	Sunderland	Wycombe Wanderers	Loan
16 January 2012	(Spain) Iago Falque	(Italy) Juventus	Tottenham Hotspur	Free
16 January 2012	(Spain) Iago Falque	Tottenham Hotspur	Southampton	Loan
16 January 2012	Lukas Jutkiewicz	Coventry City	Middlesbrough	£1.3m
17 January 2012	(Senegal) Papiss Cissé	(Germany) SC Freiburg	Newcastle United	£10m
17 January 2012	Ryan Doble	Southampton	Bury	Loan
17 January 2012	Josh McEachran	Chelsea	(Wales) Swansea City	Loan
17 January 2012	Ben Mee	Manchester City	Burnley	Undisclosed
17 January 2012	(New Zealand) Tim Payne	(New Zealand) Waitakere United	Blackburn Rovers	Free
18 January 2012	Joe Dixon	Unattached	West Ham United	Free
18 January 2012	(Scotland) Jack Grimmer	(Scotland) Aberdeen	Fulham	£200k
18 January 2012	(Switzerland) Sead Hajrović	Arsenal	Barnet	Loan
18 January 2012	Ryan Noble	Sunderland	Derby County	Loan
19 January 2012	(Nigeria) Kelvin Etuhu	Unattached	Portsmouth	Free
19 January 2012	(Scotland) John Fleck	(Scotland) Rangers	Blackpool	Loan
19 January 2012	(Colombia) David González	Unattached	Brighton & Hove Albion	Free
19 January 2012	Gavin Massey	Watford	Colchester United	Loan
19 January 2012	(France) Anthony Modeste	(France) Bordeaux	Blackburn Rovers	Loan
19 January 2012	(Republic of Ireland) Ronan Murray	Ipswich Town	Swindon Town	Loan
19 January 2012	Sam Walker	Chelsea	Yeovil Town	Loan
19 January 2012	James Wallace	Everton	Tranmere Rovers	Loan
20 January 2012	(Ghana) Daniel Boateng	Arsenal	Swindon Town	Loan
20 January 2012	Fabian Delph	Aston Villa	Leeds United	Loan
20 January 2012	Ben Dickenson	Dorchester Town	Brighton & Hove Albion	Undisclosed
20 January 2012	Danny Drinkwater	Manchester United	Leicester City	Undisclosed
20 January 2012	(Scotland) Jamie McAllister	Bristol City	Preston North End	Loan
20 January 2012	(Northern Ireland) Josh McQuoid	Millwall	Burnley	Loan
20 January 2012	Chris Weale	Leicester City	Northampton Town	Loan
20 January 2012	Phil Airey	Newcastle United	Gateshead	Loan
21 January 2012	(Scotland) Chris Kettings	Blackpool	Morecambe	Loan
23 January 2012	Nathan Delfouneso	Aston Villa	Leicester City	Loan
23 January 2012	(Scotland) James McPake	Coventry City	(Scotland) Hibernian	Loan
23 January 2012	Tom Soares	Stoke City	(Scotland) Hibernian	Loan
24 January 2012	James Harper	Hull City	Wycombe Wanderers	Loan
24 January 2012	Jonny Howson	Leeds United	Norwich City	Undisclosed
24 January 2012	Sean Morrison	Reading	Huddersfield Town	Loan
24 January 2012	(Nigeria) Taye Taiwo	(Italy) Milan	Queens Park Rangers	Loan
24 January 2012	Michael Tonge	Stoke City	Barnsley	Loan
25 January 2012	(Chile) Jean Beausejour	Birmingham City	Wigan Athletic	Undisclosed
25 January 2012	(Japan) Tadanari Lee	(Japan) Sanfrecce Hiroshima	Southampton	Free
25 January 2012	Korey Smith	Norwich City	Barnsley	Loan
26 January 2012	Will Atkinson	Hull City	Bradford City	Loan
26 January 2012	Kieron Cadogan	Crystal Palace	Rotherham United	Loan
26 January 2012	(Poland) Tomasz Cywka	Derby County	Reading	Free
26 January 2012	(Wales) Lee Lucas	(Wales) Swansea City	Burton Albion	Loan
26 January 2012	Nedum Onuoha	Manchester City	Queens Park Rangers	Undisclosed
26 January 2012	Ben Parker	Leeds United	Carlisle United	Loan
26 January 2012	(United States) Tim Ream	(United States) Major League Soccer (New York Red Bulls)	Bolton Wanderers	£2.5m
26 January 2012	(Grenada) Jason Roberts	Blackburn Rovers	Reading	Undisclosed
26 January 2012	(Nigeria) Solomon Taiwo	(Wales) Cardiff City	Leyton Orient	Loan
26 January 2012	Sam Winnall	Wolverhampton Wanderers	(Scotland) Inverness Caledonian Thistle	Loan
26 January 2012	Sanchez Watt	Arsenal	Crawley Town	Loan
27 January 2012	(Brazil) Alex	Chelsea	(France) Paris Saint-Germain	£4.5m
27 January 2012	Ryan Brunt	Stoke City	Tranmere Rovers	Loan
27 January 2012	(Belgium) Florent Cuvelier	Stoke City	Walsall	Loan
27 January 2012	(France) Nouha Dicko	Wigan Athletic	Blackpool	Loan
27 January 2012	(Barbados) Jonathan Forte	Southampton	Notts County	Loan
27 January 2012	Gavin Hoyte	Arsenal	AFC Wimbledon	Loan
27 January 2012	(Republic of Ireland) Kevin Long	Burnley	Rochdale	Loan
27 January 2012	(Australia) Shane Lowry	Aston Villa	Millwall	Undisclosed
27 January 2012	Alex Marrow	Crystal Palace	Preston North End	Loan
27 January 2012	Jordan Obita	Reading	Barnet	Loan
27 January 2012	(Saint Kitts and Nevis) Romaine Sawyers	West Bromwich Albion	Port Vale	Loan
28 January 2012	(Senegal) Mame Biram Diouf	Manchester United	(Germany) Hannover 96	Undisclosed
28 January 2012	(Czech Republic) Roman Bednář	West Bromwich Albion	Blackpool	Free
28 January 2012	(France) Elliot Grandin	Blackpool	(France) Nice	Loan
29 January 2012	(Russia) Diniyar Bilyaletdinov	Everton	(Russia) Spartak Moscow	Undisclosed
29 January 2012	(Mali) Samba Diakité	(France) Nancy	Queens Park Rangers	Loan
29 January 2012	Alan Smith	Newcastle United	Milton Keynes Dons	Loan
30 January 2012	John Bostock	Tottenham Hotspur	Sheffield Wednesday	Loan
30 January 2012	Tom Carroll	Tottenham Hotspur	Derby County	Loan
30 January 2012	Scott Golbourne	Exeter City	Barnsley	Undisclosed
30 January 2012	(Algeria) Adlène Guedioura	Wolverhampton Wanderers	Nottingham Forest	Loan
30 January 2012	Kadeem Harris	Wycombe Wanderers	(Wales) Cardiff City	Undisclosed
30 January 2012	(Sweden) Alex Kačaniklić	Fulham	Watford	Loan
30 January 2012	(Northern Ireland) Daniel Lafferty	(Northern Ireland) Derry City	Burnley	Undisclosed
30 January 2012	(Northern Ireland) Matthew Lund	Stoke City	Bristol Rovers	Loan
30 January 2012	Keanu Marsh-Brown	Fulham	Oldham Athletic	Undisclosed
30 January 2012	Wes Morgan	Nottingham Forest	Leicester City	Undisclosed
30 January 2012	(Republic of Ireland) Rhys Murphy	Arsenal	Preston North End	Loan
30 January 2012	Jordan Mustoe	Wigan Athletic	Barnet	Loan
30 January 2012	Kudus Oyenuga	Tottenham Hotspur	(Scotland) St Johnstone	Loan
30 January 2012	Jamie Reckord	Wolverhampton Wanderers	Scunthorpe United	Loan
30 January 2012	Billy Sharp	Doncaster Rovers	Southampton	Undisclosed
30 January 2012	(Scotland) Ryan Stevenson	(Scotland) Heart of Midlothian	Ipswich Town	Undisclosed
30 January 2012	(Wales) Sam Vokes	Wolverhampton Wanderers	Brighton & Hove Albion	Loan
30 January 2012	(Wales) Danny Ward	(Wales) Wrexham	Liverpool	£100k
31 January 2012	Nicky Ajose	Peterborough United	Scunthorpe United	Loan
31 January 2012	(Republic of Ireland) Keith Andrews	Blackburn Rovers	West Bromwich Albion	Free
31 January 2012	Kwesi Appiah	Margate	Crystal Palace	Undisclosed
31 January 2012	Patrick Bamford	Nottingham Forest	Chelsea	£1.5m
31 January 2012	(Cameroon) Sébastien Bassong	Tottenham Hotspur	Wolverhampton Wanderers	Loan
31 January 2012	Ryan Bennett	Peterborough United	Norwich City	Undisclosed
31 January 2012	Ryan Bennett	Norwich City	Peterborough United	Loan
31 January 2012	Wayne Bridge	Manchester City	Sunderland	Loan
31 January 2012	Clarke Carlisle	Burnley	Northampton Town	Loan
31 January 2012	Michael Chambers	Dulwich Hamlet	Crystal Palace	Undisclosed
31 January 2012	(France) Djibril Cissé	(Italy) Lazio	Queens Park Rangers	Undisclosed
31 January 2012	(Republic of Ireland) Billy Clarke	Blackpool	Crawley Town	Undisclosed
31 January 2012	Matthew Connolly	Queens Park Rangers	Reading	Loan
31 January 2012	(Croatia) Vedran Ćorluka	Tottenham Hotspur	(Germany) Bayer Leverkusen	Loan
31 January 2012	(Republic of Ireland) Stephen Dawson	Leyton Orient	Barnsley	Undisclosed
31 January 2012	(Belgium) Kevin De Bruyne	(Belgium) Genk	Chelsea	£6.7m
31 January 2012	(Belgium) Kevin De Bruyne	Chelsea	(Belgium) Genk	Loan
31 January 2012	(Republic of Ireland) Matt Doherty	Wolverhampton Wanderers	(Scotland) Hibernian	Loan
31 January 2012	(Germany) Thomas Eisfeld	(Germany) Borussia Dortmund	Arsenal	£440k
31 January 2012	(Denmark) Martin Hansen	Liverpool	(Denmark) Viborg	Free
31 January 2012	Danny Higginbotham	Stoke City	Nottingham Forest	Loan
31 January 2012	Will Hoskins	Brighton & Hove Albion	Sheffield United	Loan
31 January 2012	(Chile) Gonzalo Jara	West Bromwich Albion	Brighton & Hove Albion	Loan
31 January 2012	(Croatia) Nikica Jelavić	(Scotland) Rangers	Everton	£5.5m
31 January 2012	(Republic of Ireland) Andy Keogh	Wolverhampton Wanderers	Millwall	Undisclosed
31 January 2012	(Greece) Sotirios Kyrgiakos	(Germany) VfL Wolfsburg	Sunderland	Loan
31 January 2012	(Scotland) Alex MacDonald	Burnley	Plymouth Argyle	Loan
31 January 2012	Ben Marshall	Stoke City	Leicester City	Undisclosed
31 January 2012	Joe Mattock	West Bromwich Albion	Brighton & Hove Albion	Loan
31 January 2012	Nicky Maynard	Bristol City	West Ham United	Undisclosed
31 January 2012	Paul McCallum	West Ham United	Rochdale	Loan
31 January 2012	David Mirfin	Watford	Scunthorpe United	Loan
31 January 2012	(Japan) Ryo Miyaichi	Arsenal	Bolton Wanderers	Loan
31 January 2012	Ravel Morrison	Manchester United	West Ham United	Undisclosed
31 January 2012	Oliver Norwood	Manchester United	Coventry City	Loan
31 January 2012	Curtis Obeng	(Wales) Wrexham	(Wales) Swansea City	Undisclosed
31 January 2012	(Republic of Ireland) Roy O'Donovan	Coventry City	(Scotland) Hibernian	Loan
31 January 2012	(Sweden) Marcus Olsson	(Sweden) Halmstads BK	Blackburn Rovers	Undisclosed
31 January 2012	Bradley Orr	Queens Park Rangers	Blackburn Rovers	Undisclosed
31 January 2012	Jon Parkin	(Wales) Cardiff City	Scunthorpe United	Loan
31 January 2012	(Russia) Roman Pavlyuchenko	Tottenham Hotspur	(Russia) Lokomotiv Moscow	£8m
31 January 2012	(South Africa) Steven Pienaar	Tottenham Hotspur	Everton	Loan
31 January 2012	(Chile) David Pizarro	(Italy) Roma	Manchester City	Loan
31 January 2012	(Russia) Pavel Pogrebnyak	(Germany) VfB Stuttgart	Fulham	Undisclosed
31 January 2012	(Austria) Philipp Prosenik	Chelsea	(Italy) Milan	Undisclosed
31 January 2012	Liam Ridgewell	Birmingham City	West Bromwich Albion	Undisclosed
31 January 2012	(France) Fabien Robert	(France) Lorient	Doncaster Rovers	Loan
31 January 2012	(France) Louis Saha	Everton	Tottenham Hotspur	Undisclosed
31 January 2012	Adam Smith	Tottenham Hotspur	Leeds United	Loan
31 January 2012	Marvin Sordell	Watford	Bolton Wanderers	Undisclosed
31 January 2012	James Tavernier	Newcastle United	Milton Keynes Dons	Loan
31 January 2012	(Portugal) Ricardo Vaz Tê	Barnsley	West Ham United	Undisclosed
31 January 2012	(Switzerland) Frédéric Veseli	Manchester City	Manchester United	Undisclosed
31 January 2012	Matthew Whichelow	Watford	Wycombe Wanderers	Loan
31 January 2012	(Australia) Ryan Williams	Portsmouth	Fulham	Undisclosed
31 January 2012	Mark Wilson	Doncaster Rovers	Oxford United	Loan
31 January 2012	Scott Wootton	Manchester United	Nottingham Forest	Loan
31 January 2012	Bobby Zamora	Fulham	Queens Park Rangers	Undisclosed

- ^1 Player officially joined his club on 1 January 2012.

== Notes and references ==
General

- "Transfers – September 2011". BBC Sport. British Broadcasting Corporation. 30 September 2011.
- "Transfers - October 2011". BBC Sport. British Broadcasting Corporation. 31 October 2011.
- "Transfer - November 2011". BBC Sport. British Broadcasting Corporation. 24 November 2011.
- "Transfer - December 2011". BBC Sport. British Broadcasting Corporation. 31 December 2011.
- "Transfer - January 2012". BBC Sport. British Broadcasting Corporation. 31 January 2012.

Specific
