= Belgrade Plaza =

Mixed-use development in Coventry, England

Coordinates: 52.41043°N 1.51455°W

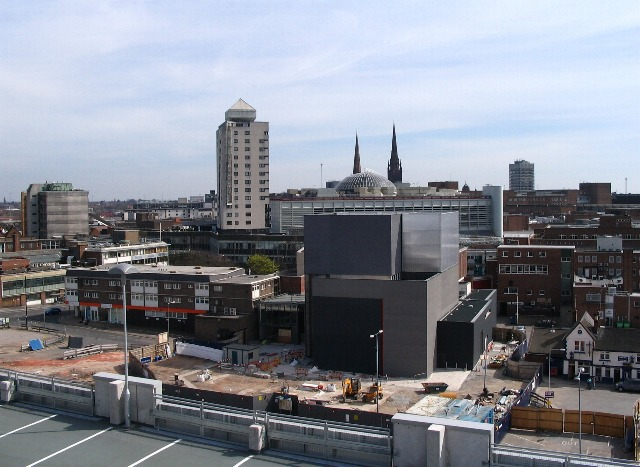
The site in 2007

The Belgrade Plaza is a £113 million mixed-use development in Coventry city centre in West Midlands, England.

== Construction ==
The Belgrade Plaza was built by the construction firm, Oakmoor Deeley. The development had two phases. The first – a 1,100-space car park – opened in 2007. The second phase has two hotels, a casino, restaurants, bars, and apartments in the area between the Belgrade Theatre and the ring road.

Gala Casino, Premier Travel Inn, Radisson Edwardian, Pizza Express, Bella Italia, and Metro Bar & Grill have been installed near the Belgrade Plaza multistorey car park.

On 12 March 2008, construction workers at the site discovered an unexploded Second World War bomb, which had been dropped during the Coventry Blitz. The site was evacuated and a cordon of 500-metre (1,600 ft) was enforced. Many workers were forced to exit their offices and leave their vehicles in car parks overnight.

Army experts carried out a controlled explosion on the bomb at 2.41 a.m. on 13 March 2008. Work resumed at 10 a.m. the following morning.
