= Jasminder Singh =

British billionaire businessman (born 1951)

- Born: April 1951 (age 75); Dar es Salaam, Tanganyika (now Tanzania)
- Occupation: Businessman
- Known for: Founder, Edwardian Hotels
- Title: Chairman and CEO, Edwardian Hotels
- Spouse: Amrit Singh
- Children: 4

Jasminder Singh OBE (born April 1951) is a British billionaire businessman.

According to the Sunday Times Rich List List in 2019, Singh is worth £1.1 billion.

== Early life ==
Jasminder Singh was born in April 1951, in Dar es Salaam, Tanganyika (now Tanzania) in an Indian family. He is the son of Bal Mohinder Singh, and they moved to the UK from Kenya in 1973, and first ran a post office together.

== Career ==
Singh first worked as an accountant. He then began working in the hotel industry for his uncle. Eventually, he was able to buy out his uncle.

Through Edwardian Hotels, of which he is the chairman and CEO, Singh owns or co-owns 12 luxury hotels in central London, under the Radisson Blu Edwardian brand, and the 404-room May Fair Hotel.

== Personal life ==
Singh is married to Amrit Singh, an interior decorator, and they live in Tetworth Hall, a large country house near Ascot, and London.

In November 2013, Jasminder's father 86-year-old Bal Mohinder Singh was taking legal action against his sons Jasminder, 62, and Herinder, 46, for about £50 million of Jasminder's reported wealth of £400 million. All three families had lived together at Tetworth Hall, until Herinder fell out with Jasminder and left. Due to the father's frail health, the hearing in November 2013 was taking place at the May Fair Hotel, rather than a normal courtroom. In April 2014, Judge William Blackburne dismissed the claim which he said had been entered "in all good faith".

His son Inderneel Singh, is managing director, of London's May Fair Hotel.

== Honours ==
In 2007, Singh was appointed Officer of the Order of the British Empire (OBE) for services to the hotel industry.
