= 2010–11 Watford F.C. season =

English football team season

Watford
2010–11 season
- Chairman: Graham Taylor
- Manager: Malky Mackay
- Stadium: Vicarage Road
- Football League Championship: 14th
- FA Cup: Fourth round (eliminated by Brighton & Hove Albion)
- League Cup: Second round (eliminated by Notts County)
- Top goalscorer: League: Danny Graham (24); All: Danny Graham (27)
- Highest home attendance: 15,538 (vs. Queens Park Rangers, 30 April 2011)
- Lowest home attendance: League: 10,620 (vs Preston North End, 15 February 2011); Cup: 6,434 (vs. Notts County, 24 August 2010)
Home colours	Away colours

Watford Football Club (also known simply as Watford, or as The Hornets) is an English association football club from the town of Watford, in Hertfordshire. The 2010–11 English football season officially began on 1 July 2010, and ended on 30 June 2011, although Watford only played competitive fixtures between August and May. The team competed in the Football League Championship for the fourth consecutive season, following relegation from the Premier League in 2006–07. The club chairman was Graham Taylor, who as a manager took Watford from the Fourth Division to the top division of English football. Their manager was Malky Mackay, and their captain was central midfielder John Eustace.

== Background ==
Watford sold several key players at the start of 2009–10, including 2008–09 Watford F.C. Player of the Season Tommy Smith, highest earner Jobi McAnuff and Hungary international striker Tamás Priskin. The team did well in their opening game, and were briefly in contention for a playoff position early in the season, but a series of postponements, poor away form and a run of one win in twelve games took Watford to within a point of relegation by April. A 3–0 home win in the penultimate game against Reading secured survival, and a 4–0 win at Coventry City on the last day of the season elevated Watford to a final position of 16th, as well as ending the team's six-month wait for an away win.

As part of financial restructuring at the club, a number of players on higher wages whose contracts expired in June 2010 were allowed to leave the club on free transfers. These included captain and USA international Jay DeMerit, former Chelsea player Jon Harley and ex-Rotherham United striker Will Hoskins. Young goalkeeper Jonathan North and winger Billy Gibson were both also released. Manager Malky Mackay did, however, decide to retain the services of Liam Henderson and Dale Bennett after the duo triggered one-year extension options in their contracts.

== Pre-season ==
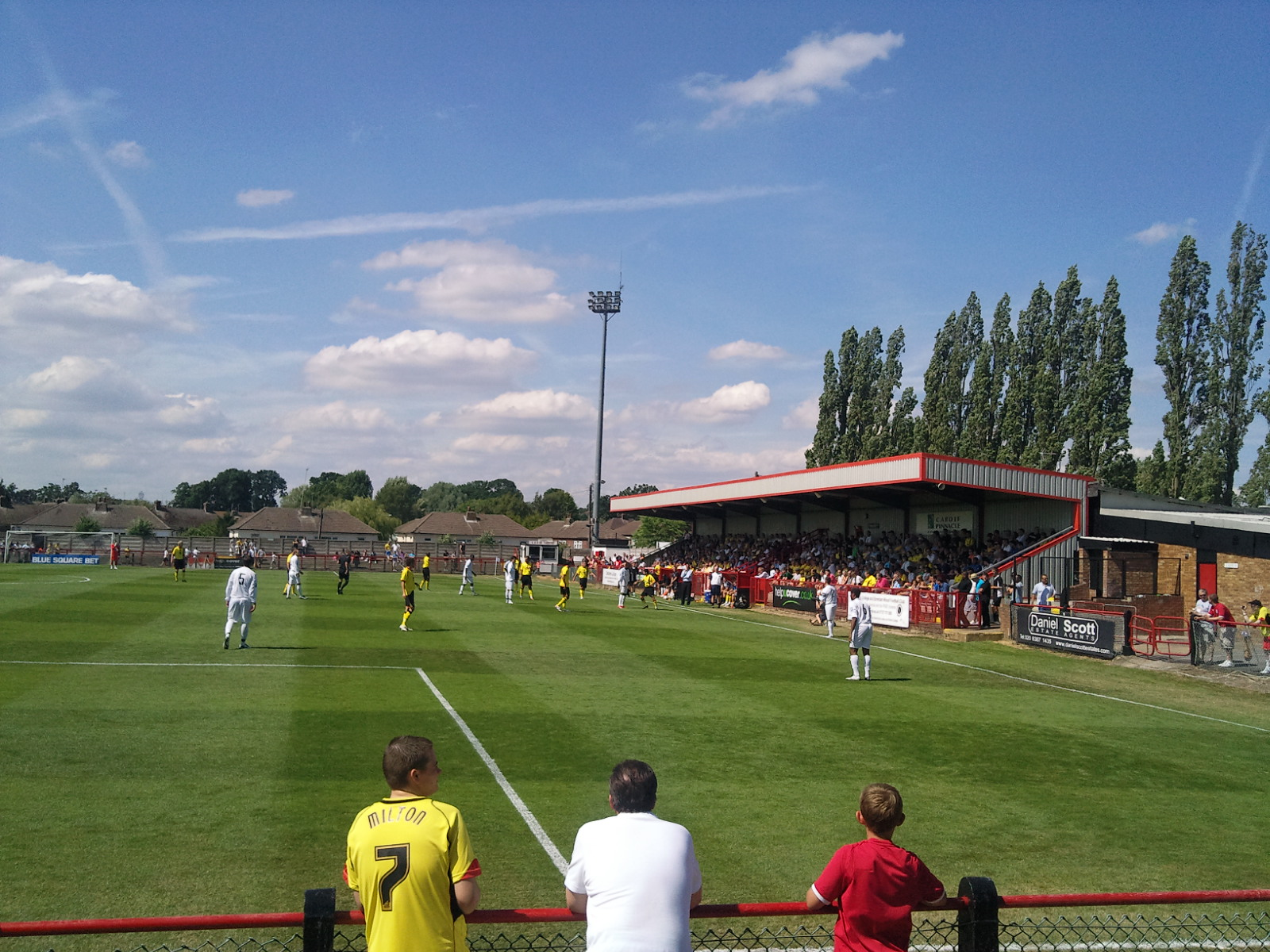
Borehamwood vs Watford at Meadow Park on 10 July 2010.

Watford began pre-season training on 1 July 2010, the same day that Tom Aldred and Rene Gilmartin officially became Watford players. The team's first friendly match was a 5–0 away win at local side Boreham Wood, in which Will Buckley scored a hat-trick. The club played several further away fixtures against local, lower division sides in July. Their only defeat in these fixtures was a 1–0 loss to Barnet at Underhill Stadium. Their final friendly game—the only pre-season match at Vicarage Road—was a 1–0 win against League One team Charlton Athletic, with Danny Graham scoring the only goal of the game. Graham was Watford's top scorer in pre-season fixtures, with four goals. Buckley and Stephen McGinn scored three goals each, Marvin Sordell scored two, and John Eustace scored one. Striker Troy Deeney joined Watford in the week after the Charlton match.

Legend

Win Draw Loss Postponed (P–P)

10 July 2010	Borehamwood	0–5	Watford	Meadow Park, Borehamwood
			10', 13', 41' Buckley; 15' Graham; 17' McGinn

17 July 2010	St Albans City	0–2	Watford	Clarence Park, St Albans
			34' Eustace; 58' McGinn	Attendance: 925

21 July 2010	Barnet	1–0	Watford	Underhill Stadium, Barnet
	Holmes 77'			Attendance: 898

24 July 2010	Northampton Town	3–3	Watford	Sixfields Stadium
	Jacobs 12', 19'; Purcell 40'		26', 77' Graham; 81' Sordell	Attendance: 1,722

27 July 2010	Stevenage	0–2	Watford	Broadhall Way, Stevenage
			57' McGinn; 73' Sordell

31 July 2010	Watford	1–0	Charlton Athletic	Vicarage Road, Watford
	Graham 8'			Attendance: 2,097

== Football League Championship ==
A total of 24 teams competed in the Football League Championship in the 2010–11 season. Each team played 46 matches; two against every other team, with one match played at each club's stadium. Three points were awarded for each win, one for a draw, and none for defeats. The provisional fixture list was released on 17 June 2010, but was subject to change in the event of clashes with other competitions, inclement weather, extraordinary circumstances, or matches being selected for television coverage. For instance, Watford's opening match of the season at Norwich City was moved from 7 to 6 August, thus becoming the first game of the 2010–11 Football League.

=== August ===
In the televised opening game of the season, away to Norwich City, Watford captain John Eustace scored the first goal of the 2010–11 Football League, after 14 minutes of play. Striker Danny Graham doubled Watford's lead before half time. Norwich pulled a goal back shortly after the interval, before Graham restored Watford's two-goal cushion in the 82nd minute. Norwich defender Michael Nelson halved Watford's lead in injury time, but the Hornets held on to win 3–2. The team's next league fixture was a home match against Coventry City, managed by former Watford boss Aidy Boothroyd. For the second match in succession, Watford took the lead, with winger Will Buckley opening the scoring just before half time. Former Coventry player Eustace scored Watford's second; an overhead volley that was later voted Goal of the Season by Watford fans. Watford led going into the last five minutes of the game, but Coventry secured a draw with late goals from David Bell and Lukas Jutkiewicz.

The Hornets extended their unbeaten start to the season a week later. Their 0–0 draw at Hull City marked Watford's first clean sheet of 2010–11, but also the first time that the team had failed to score. Their unbeaten run ended in their final game of the month, at home to newly promoted Leeds United. Leeds captain Richard Naylor scored the only goal of the game in the 6th minute, while Troy Deeney made his first start for Watford in the absence of Graham.

=== September ===
After a two-week break for international matches, Watford hosted Doncaster Rovers on 11 September. Watford trailed 1–0 at half time, before taking a 2–1 lead with a brace from Marvin Sordell. Although behind after 90 minutes, Doncaster salvaged a draw with an injury time equaliser from George Friend. Sordell scored an early goal three days later at Bristol City. Graham doubled Watford's advantage shortly after half time, to give his team a second league win of the season.

The team's next opponents were Millwall, a side managed by ex-Watford player and manager Kenny Jackett. The Hornets thrashed their opponents 6–1. Central defenders Adrian Mariappa and Martin Taylor and loanee Jordon Mutch scored their first goals of the season, while Graham, Sordell and Eustace also scored for Watford. This result took Watford into the playoff places, and was later voted by supporters as the Team Performance of the Season.

Watford's wait for a first home league win of the campaign ended on 25 September, against Middlesbrough. Graham scored the opening goal after 17 seconds, and Watford were 3–0 up after 20 minutes. Middlesbrough scored a late consolation through an own goal from Mariappa, to make the final score 3–1. In the last game of the month, Watford hosted Swansea City, managed by Malky Mackay's predecessor, Brendan Rodgers. In contrast to the previous game, Watford trailed 2–0 at half time, and 3–0 after 70 minutes. Goals from substitute Troy Deeney and Martin Taylor reduced Watford's deficit to one goal, but Rodgers' side held on to win 3–2. Despite the defeat, Watford finished the month in a playoff position.

=== October ===
Watford started October with a 1–0 away win at Sheffield United, with Sordell scoring the game's only goal. After a two-week gap in the fixture list for international matches, the Hornets travelled to Portsmouth. Watford trailed 1–0 at half time, to a goal from Hayden Mullins. They equalised through Martin Taylor after 67 minutes, and Stephen McGinn's first league goal of the season three minutes later gave Watford the lead. However, Portsmouth equalised shortly afterwards, and Michael Brown scored Portsmouth's winner in the 80th minute. McGinn doubled his league tally three days later, opening the scoring at home to Ipswich Town, before Sordell doubled Watford's advantage. Ipswich improved in the second half, following the introduction of substitute Connor Wickham. After conceding in the 69th minute, Watford held on for a 2–1 win.

The team's next opponents were Scunthorpe United, who along with Watford had been tipped for relegation in 2010–11. Scunthorpe started strongly. They took the lead on 28 minutes, doubling their advantage shortly before half time. Watford improved after the break, but were unable to prevent a 2–0 defeat. Watford's final match of October was a trip to Pride Park, to face Derby County. In front of 27,119 spectators, the home side took a two-goal lead in the first half. Matthew Whichelow's first senior goal reduced Watford's deficit, but goals from Tomasz Cywka and Shefki Kuqi consigned Watford to a 4–1 defeat, which took them out of the playoff places.

=== November ===
After defeat at Derby County, Watford hosted Derby's rivals, Nottingham Forest. Mutch scored the opening goal with a header after three minutes, before Lewis McGugan equalised midway through the first half. Both teams created goal scoring opportunities in the second half, but the match finished 1–1.

Watford's next two games were away from home, to Crystal Palace and Burnley. The two matches followed a very similar pattern. In each match, the home side scored the opening goal in the first half. Watford were able to take 2–1 leads shortly into the second halves, but on each occasion the home side came back to win 3–2. Mackay expressed frustration at his side's inability to score goals against Palace, after creating nine chances in the first half. He was critical of the referee's decision to award Burnley a penalty, but made clear that there is "no room for hard luck stories" in football.

=== Results ===
6 August 2010	Norwich City	2–3	Watford	Carrow Road, Norwich
	Crofts 52'; Nelson 90+1'		24', 81' Graham; 14' Eustace	Attendance: 24,348; Referee: Nigel Miller

14 August 2010	Watford	2–2	Coventry City	Vicarage Road, Watford
	Buckley 45+3'; Eustace 58'		88' Bell; 90+1' Jutkiewicz (pen.)	Attendance: 12,813; Referee: Trevor Kettle (Note: Fourth official Matt Stewart replaced Kettle shortly after John Eustace's goal, due to injury.)

21 August 2010	Hull City	0–0	Watford	KC Stadium, Kingston upon Hull
				Attendance: 20,426; Referee: Scott Mathieson

28 August 2010	Watford	0–1	Leeds United	Vicarage Road, Watford
			6' Naylor	Attendance: 14,039; Referee: James Linington

11 September 2010	Watford	2–2	Doncaster Rovers	Vicarage Road, Watford
	Sordell 63', 70'		6' Gillett; 90+3' Friend	Attendance: 15,101; Referee: Darren Sheldrake

14 September 2010	Bristol City	0–2	Watford	Ashton Gate, Bristol
			3' Sordell; 47' Graham	Attendance: 13,998; Referee: Phil Gibbs

18 September 2010	Millwall	1–6	Watford	The Den, London
	Trotter 56'		7' Eustace; 13' Mutch; 45+2' Sordell; 54' Mariappa; 77' Graham; 90+1' M Taylor	Attendance: 12,562; Referee: Rob Shoebridge

25 September 2010	Watford	3–1	Middlesbrough	Vicarage Road, Watford
	Graham 1', 20'; Mutch 11'		77' (o.g.) Mariappa	Attendance: 12,185; Referee: Fred Graham

28 September 2010	Watford	2–3	Swansea City	Vicarage Road, Watford
	Deeney 76'; M Taylor 85'		11' Sinclair; 30' Dobbie; 69' Nouble	Attendance: 11,485; Referee: Iain Williamson

2 October 2010	Sheffield United	0–1	Watford	Bramall Lane, Sheffield
			16' Sordell	Attendance: 22,433; Referee: Colin Webster

16 October 2010	Portsmouth	3–2	Watford	Fratton Park, Portsmouth
	Mullins 17'; Kitson 72'; Brown 80'		67' M Taylor; 70' McGinn	Attendance: 16,606; Referee: Danny McDermid

19 October 2010	Watford	2–1	Ipswich Town	Vicarage Road, Watford
	McGinn 41'; Sordell 43'		69' Norris	Attendance: 11,836; Referee: Graham Scott

23 October 2010	Watford	0–2	Scunthorpe United	Vicarage Road, Watford
			28' Byrne; 45+1' Woolford	Attendance: 12,366; Referee: Roger East

30 October 2010	Derby County	4–1	Watford	Pride Park Stadium, Derby
	Brayford 14'; Cywka 36', 81'; Kuqi 65'		55' Whichelow	Attendance: 27,119; Referee: Paul Tierney

6 November 2010	Watford	1–1	Nottingham Forest	Vicarage Road, Watford
	Mutch 3'		20' McGugan	Attendance: 13,708; Referee: Jon Moss

9 November 2010	Crystal Palace	3–2	Watford	Selhurst Park, London
	Ambrose 18'; Garvan 56', 59'		48' Graham; 52' Mutch	Attendance: 12,353; Referee: Andy Penn

13 November 2010	Burnley	3–2	Watford	Turf Moor, Burnley
	Iwelumo; Wallace; Alexander 89' (pen.)		30' Cowie; 57' M Taylor	Attendance: 14,160; Referee: Chris Sarginson

20 November 2010	Watford	1–1	Reading	Vicarage Road, Watford
	Deeney 40'		15' Hunt	Attendance: 12,196; Referee: Simon Hooper

27 November 2010	Barnsley	0–0	Watford	Oakwell, Barnsley
				Attendance: 10,653; Referee: Graham Salisbury

4 December 2010	Watford	3–2	Leicester City	Vicarage Road, Watford
	Eustace 15'; Buckley 22'; Graham 85'		50' (pen.), 69' Gallagher	Attendance: 14,449; Referee: Kevin Wright

10 December 2010	QPR	1–3	Watford	Loftus Road, London
	Smith 89'		26', 48' Graham; 30' Mutch	Attendance: 14,079; Referee: Darren Deadman

18 December 2010	Watford	P–P	Preston	Vicarage Road, Watford

26 December 2010	Ipswich Town	P–P	Watford	Portman Road, Ipswich

28 December 2010	Watford	4–1	Cardiff City	Vicarage Road, Watford
	Graham 24' (pen.), 84'; Sordell 57'; Eustace 64'		16' Whittingham	Attendance: 14,560; Referee: Mark Haywood

1 January 2011	Watford	3–0	Portsmouth	Vicarage Road, Watford
	A Taylor 42'; Sordell 52'; Graham 69'		(red card) 90' Halford	Attendance: 12,577; Referee: Andy D'Urso

3 January 2011	Scunthorpe United	1–2	Watford	Glanford Park, Scunthorpe
	Woolford 60'		64' Graham; 85' Whichelow	Attendance: 4,498; Referee: Andy Haines

15 January 2011	Watford	3–0	Derby	Vicarage Road, Watford
	Buckley 36'; Graham 43'; Sordell 45+2'			Attendance: 12,917; Referee: Gavin Ward

22 January 2011	Cardiff City	4–2	Watford	Cardiff City Stadium, Cardiff
	Bellamy 14'; Chopra 17'; Bothroyd 32'; Gyepes 83'		33' Buckley; 48' Sordell	Attendance: 23,702; Referee: Steve Tanner

1 February 2011	Watford	1–1	Crystal Palace	Vicarage Road, Watford
	Weimann 10'		40' Vaughan	Attendance: 12,664; Referee: Keith Stroud

5 February 2011	Nottingham Forest	1–0	Watford	City Ground, Nottingham
	Tudgay 1'			Attendance: 23,393; Referee: Graham Scott

12 February 2011	Watford	1–3	Burnley	Vicarage Road, Watford
	Graham 13'		8' (o.g.) Bennett; 66' Eagles; 75' Iwelumo	Attendance: 13,103; Referee: Anthony Bates

15 February 2011	Watford	2–2	Preston North End	Vicarage Road, Watford
	Whichelow 69'; Thompson 79'		1' St Ledger; 37' Clarke	Attendance: 10,620; Referee: Kevin Friend

19 February 2011	Reading	1–1	Watford	Madejski Stadium, Reading
	Hunt 50'		27' Weimann	Attendance: 16,934; Referee: Peter Walton

22 February 2011	Watford	1–3	Bristol City	Vicarage Road, Watford
	Cowie 19'		32' Maynard; 69' Elliott; 90+3' Pitman	Attendance: 12,125; Referee: Craig Pawson

26 February 2011	Doncaster	1–1	Watford	Keepmoat Stadium, Doncaster
	Euell 45+1'		22' Graham; (red card) 82' Eustace	Attendance: 8,954; Referee: Nigel Miller

5 March 2011	Watford	1–0	Millwall	Vicarage Road, Watford
	Graham 51'			Attendance: 13,539; Referee: Graham Salisbury

8 March 2011	Swansea	1–1	Watford	Liberty Stadium, Swansea
	Dobbie 26'		78' Graham	Attendance: 14,410; Referee: Lee Mason

12 March 2011	Watford	3–0	Sheffield United	Vicarage Road, Watford
	Graham 10'; Taylor 57'; Jenkins 86'		(red card) 28' Henderson; (red card) 34' Williamson	Attendance: 12,441; Referee: Dean Whitestone

15 March 2011	Ipswich	0–3	Watford	Portman Road, Ipswich
			3', 61' Graham; 90+1' Cowie	Attendance: 17,789; Referee: Grant Hegley

19 March 2011	Middlesbrough	2–1	Watford	The Riverside, Middlesbrough
	McDonald 33'; Taylor 45'		28' Graham; (red card) 88' Mariappa	Attendance: 16,090; Referee: Gary Sutton

2 April 2011	Coventry City	2–0	Watford	Ricoh Arena, Coventry
	McSheffrey 27'; Jutkiewicz 66'			Attendance: 16,519; Referee: Carl Boyeson

9 April 2011	Watford	1–2	Hull City	Vicarage Road, Watford
	Taylor 90+2'		3' C Evans; 90' Koren	Attendance: 13,355; Referee: Dave Phillips

12 April 2011	Watford	2–2	Norwich City	Vicarage Road, Watford
	Graham 26'; Cowie 36'		2' Vokes; 69' Jackson	Attendance: 13,777; Referee: Anthony Taylor

16 April 2011	Leeds United	2–2	Watford	Elland Road, Leeds
	Becchio 72'; Deeney (o.g.) 88'		78' Hodson; 86' Weimann	Attendance: 30,240; Referee: Andy Woolmer

23 April 2011	Watford	1–0	Barnsley	Vicarage Road, Watford
	Eustace 2'			Attendance: 14,098; Referee: Danny McDermid

25 April 2011	Leicester City	4–2	Watford	Walkers Stadium, Leicester
	Bruma 39', 73'; Yakubu 62', 75'		28', 41' Sordell	Attendance: 21,473; Referee: Bates

30 April 2011	Watford	0–2	QPR	Vicarage Road, Watford
			Taarabt 77'; Smith 90+3'	Attendance: 15,538; Referee: Swarbick

7 May 2011	Preston North End	3–1	Watford	Deepdale, Preston
	Nicholson 28'; Hume 56'; Proctor 88'		13' Weimann	Attendance: 10,953; Referee: Bates

==== Summary ====
Key

- H: Home fixture
- A: Away fixture
- Win (W)
- Draw (D)
- Loss (L)
- First position (1)
- Playoff position (3–6)

Correct as of 7 May 2011. (Note: Positions refer to Watford's league placing at the end of the day on which they played the match. This has produced one particularly anomalous result: Watford were top of the table after their first match, as only they and Norwich City had played a game. By the end of the following day, Watford were joint-seventh in the table.)

Game	1	2	3	4	5	6	7	8	9	10	11	12	13	14	15	16	17	18	19	20	21	22	23	24	25	26	27	28	29	30	31	32	33	34	35	36	37	38	39	40	41	42	43	44	45	46
Ground	A	H	A	H	H	A	A	H	H	A	A	H	H	A	H	A	A	H	A	H	A	H	H	A	H	A	H	A	H	H	A	H	A	H	A	H	A	A	A	H	H	A	H	A	H	A
Result	W	D	D	L	D	W	W	W	L	W	L	W	L	L	D	L	L	D	D	W	W	W	W	W	W	L	D	L	L	D	D	L	D	W	D	W	W	L	L	L	D	D	W	L	L	L
Points	3	4	5	5	6	9	12	15	15	18	18	21	21	21	22	22	22	23	24	27	30	33	36	39	42	42	43	43	43	44	45	45	46	49	50	53	56	56	56	56	57	58	61	61	61	61
Position	1	6	8	13	13	12	5	3	4	4	5	3	5	9	11	13	13	14	14	10	8	8	6	6	6	7	7	9	11	11	11	12	12	12	11	11	8	9	10	12	11	13	11	12	13	14

==== League table ====
Pos	Team	Pld	W	D	L	GF	GA	GD	Pts
12	Middlesbrough	46	17	11	18	68	68	0	62
13	Ipswich Town	46	18	8	20	62	68	−6	62
14	Watford	46	16	13	17	77	71	+6	61
15	Bristol City	46	17	9	20	62	65	−3	60
16	Portsmouth	46	15	13	18	53	60	−7	58

Updated to match(es) played on 7 May 2011. Source: The Football League
Rules for classification: 1) points; 2) goal difference; 3) number of goals scored.

== FA Cup ==
The FA Cup is an annual knockout competition. It began in August with two preliminary rounds, followed by four qualifying rounds. The successful qualifiers progressed to the First Round, when teams from League One and League Two entered the competition. Watford, along with other Premier League and Championship clubs, entered at the Third Round stage. They were joined by the 20 winners from the Second Round for a total of 64 clubs in the Third Round draw.

The Third Round draw took place on 28 November 2010. It saw Watford drawn at home to the winners of the Second Round tie between League One teams Hartlepool United and Yeovil Town; Hartlepool eventually progressed. Watford designated the game as the club's "Marie Curie Match", in support of Marie Curie Cancer Care. In an English league football first, the club pledged to donate its share of the ticket sale profits to the charity, and launched a separate online fundraiser for fans who wanted to support the charity but couldn't attend the fixture, as well as those who wished to make an additional donation.

8 January 2011	Watford	4–1	Hartlepool United	Vicarage Road, Watford
	Mingoia 66'; Sordell 68', 82'; Graham 90'		45+1' Sweeney	Attendance: 8,950; Referee: Russell Booth

29 January 2011	Watford	0–1	Brighton & Hove Albion	Vicarage Road, Watford
			Barnes 16'	Attendance: 14,519; Referee: Eddie Ilderton

== Football League Cup ==
The draw for the first round of the Football League Cup took place on 16 June 2010, and saw Watford drawn away to League Two side Aldershot Town. Coincidentally, the two sides were due to play one another at Aldershot's stadium in a pre-season match at the end of July; that fixture was cancelled by mutual agreement following the draw. The ten outfield players that started Watford's opening match against Norwich kept their places in the starting line-up, while Rene Gilmartin kept a clean sheet on his competitive Watford debut. A brace from Danny Graham and a first goal of the season from Marvin Sordell gave Watford a 3–0 victory.

In the second round, the Hornets faced League One outfit Notts County at Vicarage Road. Watford made five changes from the team that started in the 0–0 draw against Hull City; Hodson, Taylor, Eustace, Graham and Loach were rested. Among the replacements were Troy Deeney, who made his first start for Watford, and academy scholar Adam Thompson, who was playing his first ever game of senior football. After a goalless first half, Notts County took a 2–0 lead. Deeney scored to reduce their lead to 2–1, but Watford were unable to score an equaliser. Ex-Watford player Jon Harley came on as a late substitute for Notts County, and was applauded by fans of his former club.

10 August 2010	Aldershot Town	0–3	Watford	Recreation Ground, Aldershot
			14', 48' Graham; 45' Sordell	Attendance: 3,292; Referee: Andy Woolmer

24 August 2010	Watford	1–2	Notts County	Vicarage Road, Watford
	Deeney 78'		46' Davies; 45' Smith	Attendance: 6,434; Referee: Phil Crossley

== Players ==
=== Statistics ===
No. = Squad number

Pos = Playing position

P = Number of games played

G = Number of goals scored

= Yellow cards

GK = Goalkeeper

DF = Defender

MF = Midfielder

FW = Forward

= Red cards

Yth = Whether player went through Watford's youth system

Club career = Period that player spent as a Watford first team player

Age = Age of player on final day of season (7 May 2011)

Club career lengths correct as of 14 July 2012. Only players that were named in at least one matchday squad are listed.

2010–11 Watford player details
No.	Pos	Name	P	G	P	G	P	G	P	G	Yellow cards	Red cards	Age	Club career	Yth	Notes
No.	Pos	Name	Championship		FA Cup		League Cup		Total		Discipline		Age	Club career	Yth	Notes
1	GK	Scott Loach	46	0	0	0	0	0	46	0	3	0	22 years, 345 days	2006–	No	—
2	DF	Lee Hodson	29	1	1	0	1	0	31	1	1	0	19 years, 217 days	2009–	Yes	—
3	DF	Tommie Hoban	1	0	0	0	0	0	1	0	0	0	17 years, 103 days	2011–	Yes	—
3	DF	Andrew Taylor	19	1	0	0	0	0	19	1	4	0	24 years, 279 days	2010–2011	No	(Note: At Watford on loan from Middlesbrough.)
4	MF	John Eustace	41	6	0	0	1	0	42	6	11	1	31 years, 185 days	2008–	No	—
5	DF	Martin Taylor	46	6	2	0	1	0	49	6	1	0	31 years, 179 days	2010–	No	—
6	DF	Adrian Mariappa	45	1	2	0	2	0	49	1	2	1	24 years, 216 days	2005–	Yes	—
7	MF	Don Cowie	37	4	0	0	2	0	39	4	3	0	28 years, 81 days	2009–2011	No	—
8	MF	Josh Walker	5	0	0	0	0	0	5	0	0	0	22 years, 75 days	2010–2012	No	(Note: Also played a League Cup game for Middlesbrough, prior to signing for Watford.)
9	FW	Troy Deeney	36	2	2	0	2	1	40	3	2	0	22 years, 312 days	2010–	No	—
10	FW	Danny Graham	45	24	2	1	2	2	49	27	4	0	25 years, 268 days	2009–2011	No	—
11	MF	Will Buckley	33	4	2	0	2	0	37	4	3	0	21 years, 167 days	2010–2011	No	—
12	DF	Lloyd Doyley	36	0	2	0	2	0	40	0	2	0	28 years, 157 days	2001–	Yes	—
13	GK	Rene Gilmartin	0	0	2	0	2	0	4	0	0	0	23 years, 341 days	2010–2012	No	—
14	MF	Ross Jenkins	19	1	1	0	2	0	22	1	2	0	20 years, 179 days	2008–	Yes	—
15	MF	Stephen McGinn	29	2	2	0	2	0	33	2	0	0	22 years, 156 days	2010–	No	—
16	MF	Michael Bryan	5	0	0	0	2	0	7	0	0	0	21 years, 75 days	2009–2012	Yes	—
17	DF	Dale Bennett	10	0	1	0	1	0	12	0	1	0	21 years, 121 days	2008–	Yes	—
18	MF	Jordan Mutch	23	5	0	0	0	0	23	5	3	0	19 years, 156 days	2010–2011	No	(Note: At Watford on loan from Birmingham City.)
19	FW	Liam Henderson	0	0	0	0	0	0	0	0	0	0	21 years, 130 days	2007–2011	Yes	—
20	FW	Marvin Sordell	42	12	2	2	2	1	46	15	3	0	20 years, 79 days	2009–2012	Yes	—
21	MF	Rob Kiernan	0	0	1	0	0	0	1	0	0	0	20 years, 114 days	2009–2011	Yes	—
22	FW	Andreas Weimann	18	4	1	0	0	0	19	4	2	0	19 years, 275 days	2011	No	(Note: At Watford on loan from Aston Villa.)
23	MF	Piero Mingoia	5	0	2	1	0	0	7	1	0	0	19 years, 199 days	2010–	Yes	—
24	FW	Matthew Whichelow	19	3	2	0	0	0	21	3	0	0	19 years, 221 days	2010–	Yes	—
25	DF	Eddie Oshodi	0	0	0	0	1	0	1	0	0	0	19 years, 113 days	2009–2011	Yes	—
26	MF	Sean Murray	2	0	0	0	0	0	2	0	0	0	17 years, 208 days	2010–	Yes	—
27	FW	Gavin Massey	3	0	1	0	0	0	4	0	0	0	18 years, 215 days	2010–	Yes	—
28	DF	Tom Aldred	0	0	0	0	0	0	0	0	0	0	20 years, 238 days	2010–2011	No	—
29	DF	Adam Thompson	10	1	0	0	1	0	11	1	3	0	18 years, 221 days	2010–	Yes	—
30	GK	Jonathan Bond	0	0	0	0	0	0	0	0	0	0	17 years, 353 days	2010–	Yes	—
31	MF	Andros Townsend	3	0	0	0	0	0	3	0	0	0	19 years, 295 days	2011	No	(Note: At Watford on loan from Tottenham Hotspur.)
31	MF	Chez Isaac	0	0	0	0	0	0	0	0	0	0	18 years, 172 days	2011–2012	Yes	—
32	MF	Danny Drinkwater	12	0	0	0	0	0	12	0	1	0	21 years, 63 days	2011	No	—
33	MF	Connor Smith	0	0	0	0	0	0	0	0	0	0	18 years, 78 days	2011–	Yes	—
34	MF	Britt Assombalonga	0	0	0	0	0	0	0	0	0	0	18 years, 152 days	2011–	Yes	—

=== Transfers ===
Unless a country is specified, all clubs play in the English football league system.

==== In ====
Date	Player	From	Fee
1 July 2010	Rene Gilmartin	Walsall	Undisclosed
1 July 2010	Tom Aldred	Carlisle United	Undisclosed
6 August 2010	Troy Deeney	Walsall	£500,000 (Note: Walsall stated that the Deeny transfer was "worth £500,000", while Watford stated that the deal's value "could rise to £500,000 over the term of the contract. The deal also stipulates that Watford must pay Walsall £150,000 if they are promoted to the Premier League during Deeney's contract.)
20 August 2010	Josh Walker	Middlesbrough	Free

==== Out ====
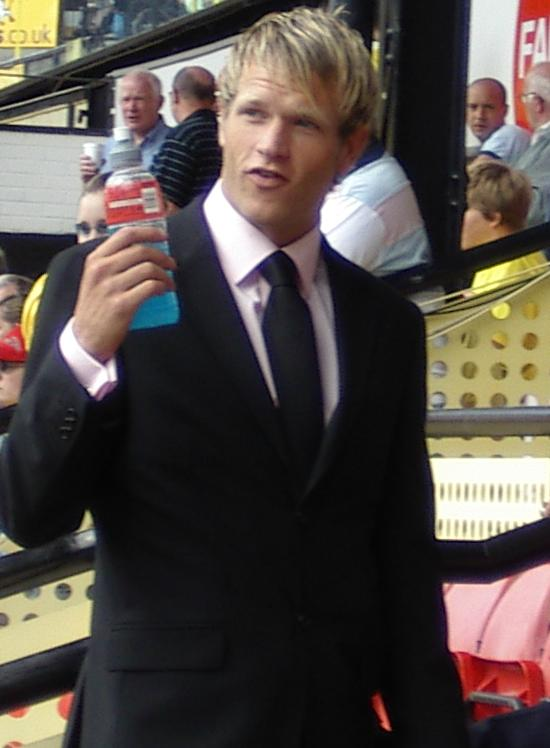
Club captain Jay DeMerit's contract expired at the end of the 2009–10 season.

Date (Note: "End of season" denotes players who were available for the final game of the season, and subsequently left upon the expiry of their contracts.)	Player	To	Fee
21 June 2010	Jordan Parkes	Barnet (Note: Parkes later signed for Barnet.)	Mutual termination
30 June 2010	Richard Lee	Brentford (Note: Lee subsequently signed for Brentford.)	Free (end of contract)
Pre-season	Jay DeMerit	Vancouver Whitecaps FC (Canada)	Free (end of contract)
Pre-season	Billy Gibson	Yeovil Town	Free (end of contract)
Pre-season	Jon Harley	Notts County (Note: Harley subsequently joined Notts County.)	Free (end of contract)
Pre-season	Will Hoskins	Bristol Rovers (Note: Hoskins later signed for Bristol Rovers.)	Free (end of contract)
Pre-season	Jonathan North	Wealdstone	Free (end of contract)
Pre-season	Lewis Young	Burton Albion	Free (end of contract)
31 August 2010	Scott Severin	Dundee United (Scotland)	Free
28 January 2011	Jure Travner	St Mirren (Scotland)	Free

=== Loans ===
==== In ====
Start	Player	From	End
August 2010	Jordan Mutch	Birmingham City	5 January 2011
31 August 2010	Andrew Taylor	Middlesbrough	5 January 2011
19 January 2011	Andreas Weimann	Aston Villa	End of season
20 January 2011	Andros Townsend	Tottenham Hotspur	23 February 2011 (Note: The loan was originally set to last until the end of the season, but was terminated early by Watford after his spell was deemed unsatisfactory.)
28 January 2011	Danny Drinkwater	Manchester United	End of season

==== Out ====
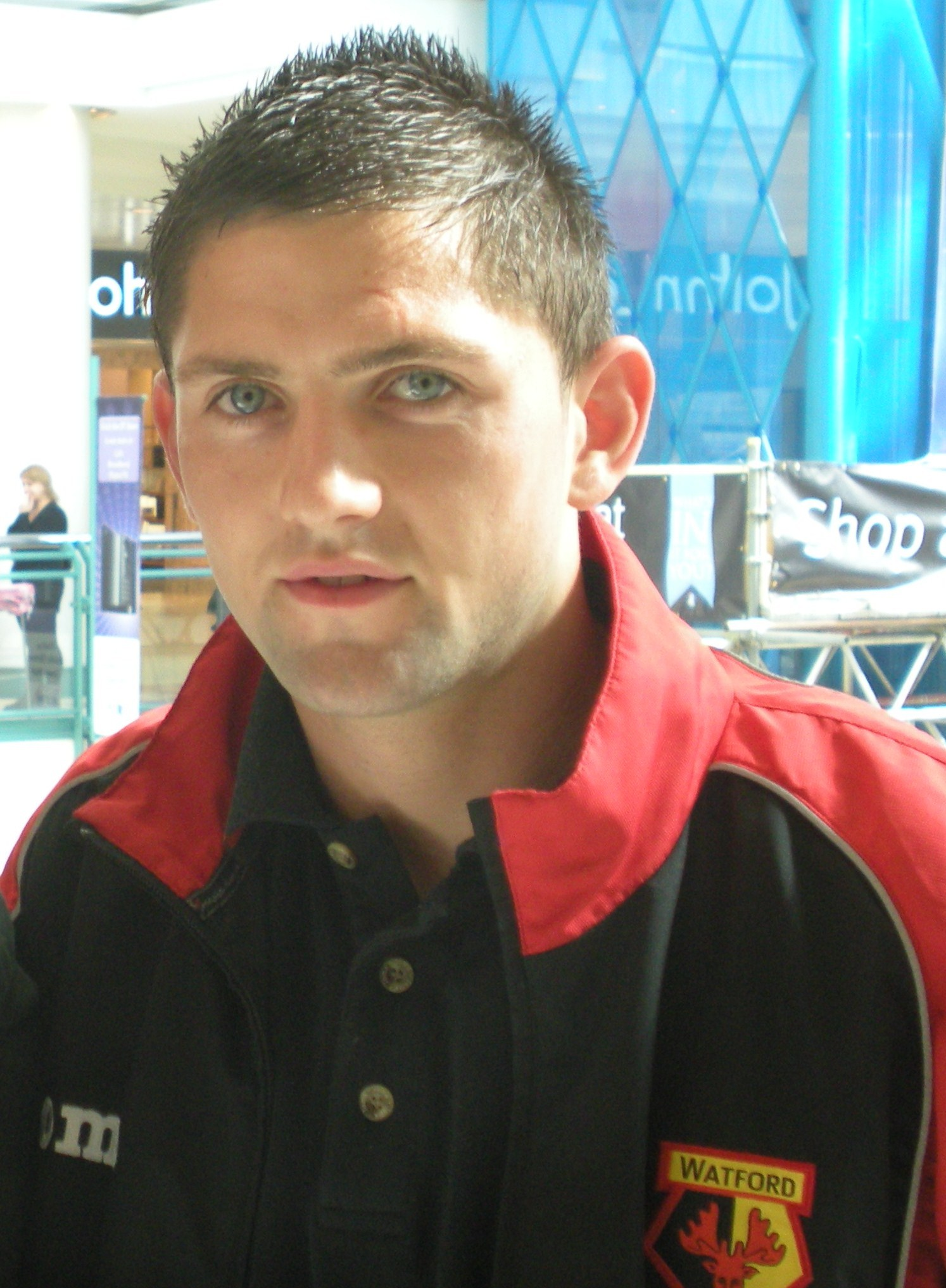
Academy graduate Liam Henderson spent time out on loan to three clubs during the season.

Start	Player	To	End (Note: "End of season" denotes players that returned to Watford after their last game of the season.)
1 January 2010	Nathan Ellington	Skoda Xanthi (Greece)	1 January 2011
13 January 2011	Nathan Ellington	Preston North End	End of season
7 July 2010	Mat Sadler	Shrewsbury Town	End of season (Note: Originally until January 2011, but extended to the end of the 2010–11 season.)
10 July 2010	Jure Travner	St Mirren (Scotland)	28 January 2011 (Note: The loan was originally set to last until the end of the season, but was terminated after Travner joined St Mirren on a permanent contract.)
28 July 2010	Rob Kiernan	Yeovil Town	25 August 2010
12 November 2010	Rob Kiernan	Bradford City	22 January 2011 (Note: Kiernan's loan originally lasted until 5 January, but was extended to 22 January.)
23 February 2011	Rob Kiernan	Wycombe Wanderers	End of season (Note: Kiernan's loan originally lasted until 23 March, but was extended to the end of the season.)
14 September 2010	Liam Henderson	Colchester United	Early January 2011
6 January 2011	Liam Henderson	Aldershot Town	6 February 2011 (Note: Henderson's loan lasted until 6 February, but he returned to Watford to train prior to that date, after Aldershot changed their manager and sent Henderson back. He was unable to go out on loan again until the loan expired.)
16 February 2011	Liam Henderson	Rotherham United	End of season (Note: Henderson's loan originally lasted until 18 March, but was extended to the end of the season.)
13 November 2010	Tom Aldred	Stockport County	5 January 2011
25 November 2010	Eddie Oshodi	Dagenham & Redbrige	5 January 2011
26 January 2011	Eddie Oshodi	Rushden & Diamonds	26 April 2011
26 November 2010	Josh Walker	Stevenage	23 December 2010 (Note: The loan was originally set to last until 5 January 2011, but Walker was recalled following an injury to Stephen McGinn.)
28 January 2011	Josh Walker	Northampton Town	End of season
7 March 2011	Gavin Massey	Wealdstone	21 April 2011 (Note: Massey's loan originally lasted until the end of the season, but he was recalled on 21 April.)

== Management and coaching staff ==
Position	Staff
Manager	Malky Mackay
Assistant manager	Sean Dyche
First team coach	David Kerslake
Goalkeeping Coach	Alec Chamberlain
Head of Football Business and Development	John Stephenson
Head of Conditioning/coach	Matt Springham
Head of Medical	Richard Collinge
Strength and Conditioning coach	Mathew Monte-Colombo
Youth coach	Joe McBride

== Reserves and academy ==
Watford's reserve side compete in the Totesport.com Combination East Division, which they won in 2009–10. They play their home games at Meadow Park, home of Conference South side Borehamwood. They also played in the Herts Senior Cup, where they went out to Stevenage.

Watford's academy consists of 22 scholars:

- In the second year, goalkeepers Jonathan Bond and Jamie Irving, defenders Oliver Archer, Adam Fenwick, Faisal Hemati and Adam Thompson, midfielders Greg Deer, Chez Isaac and Britt Assombalonga and strikers Gavin Massey and Jake Rosier.
- In the first year, goalkeeper Jack Bonham, defenders Chimdi Akubuine, Matt Bevans, Tommie Hoban, Brandon Horner and Aaron Tumwa, midfielders Stephan Hamilton Forbes and Sean Murray, and strikers Dereece Gardner, Michael Kalu and Connor Smith.

Schoolboys Mohamed Bettamer, Kamaron English and Bernard Mensah also played for the academy side, along with trialist Peter Grant. Hoban, Massey, Murray and Thompson have made first-team appearances in 2010–11, while Assombalonga, Bond, Isaac and Smith have been unused substitutes.

Massey, Murray and Bond signed professional contracts during the 2010 pre-season, with Murray signing his alongside his scholarship forms. Bonham and Thompson signed contracts in September and November respectively. In April Watford announced the fates of the remaining second year scholars; Assombalonga and Isaac were given professional contracts and Archer, Deer, Fenwick, Hemati, Irving and Rosier were released.

The under-18s play their home games at Watford's training base at the UCL training ground, London Colney. They are members of the FA Premier Academy League. They also played in the FA Youth Cup, where they defeated Swindon Town (at home), Wigan Athletic (at home) and Fulham (away), before losing to Chelsea 2–1 at Stamford Bridge in the quarter-finals. Watford also sent an under-15 side to the 2010 Milk Cup in Northern Ireland, where they finished seventh.

== Ownership and finance ==
Watford Football Club is owned by the holding company Watford Leisure Plc (LSE: WFC). The holding company's 2009–10 financial year ran from 1 July 2009 until 30 June 2010. It released its audited accounts and annual report on 31 October 2010, which included details of the club's major shareholders. At the time of the report Fordwat Limited, the investment company of Michael Ashcroft, owned 37.16% of Watford Leisure. Valley Grown Salads (VGS), owned by former Watford Leisure directors Jimmy and Vince Russo, held a 29.98% stake. Previous Watford chairman Graham Simpson had a 16.79% share. No other individual or organisation held more than 3% of the company's shares.

As 2009–10 was the club's third consecutive season in the Championship, it stopped receiving parachute payments from the Premier League. Consequently, money received from the Premier League fell from £12,298,000 in 2008–09 to £993,000 in 2009–10. This was the primary contributor in Watford Leisure's total revenue dropping by 51.2% from £23.049 million to £11.258 million. A reduction in salary costs of £4.121 million and a profit of £4.111 million on player trading helped to mitigate the reduction in revenue. Nonetheless, the company's loss before taxation was £4.063 million, up from a loss of £1.987 million in the previous financial year.

In December 2010, the Board of Directors announced to the stock exchange that discussions were underway between Ashcroft and a potential buyer of his shares, but stressed that these discussions were at an early stage. If a buyer were to acquire over 30% of Watford Leisure's shares, they would be required by stock exchange rules to make an offer for all remaining shares.

A takeover offer for Watford Leisure plc was initiated on 10 March 2011, by newly formed holding company Watford FC Limited, owned by Laurence Bassini.
