= Radisson Blu Edwardian Vanderbilt Hotel =

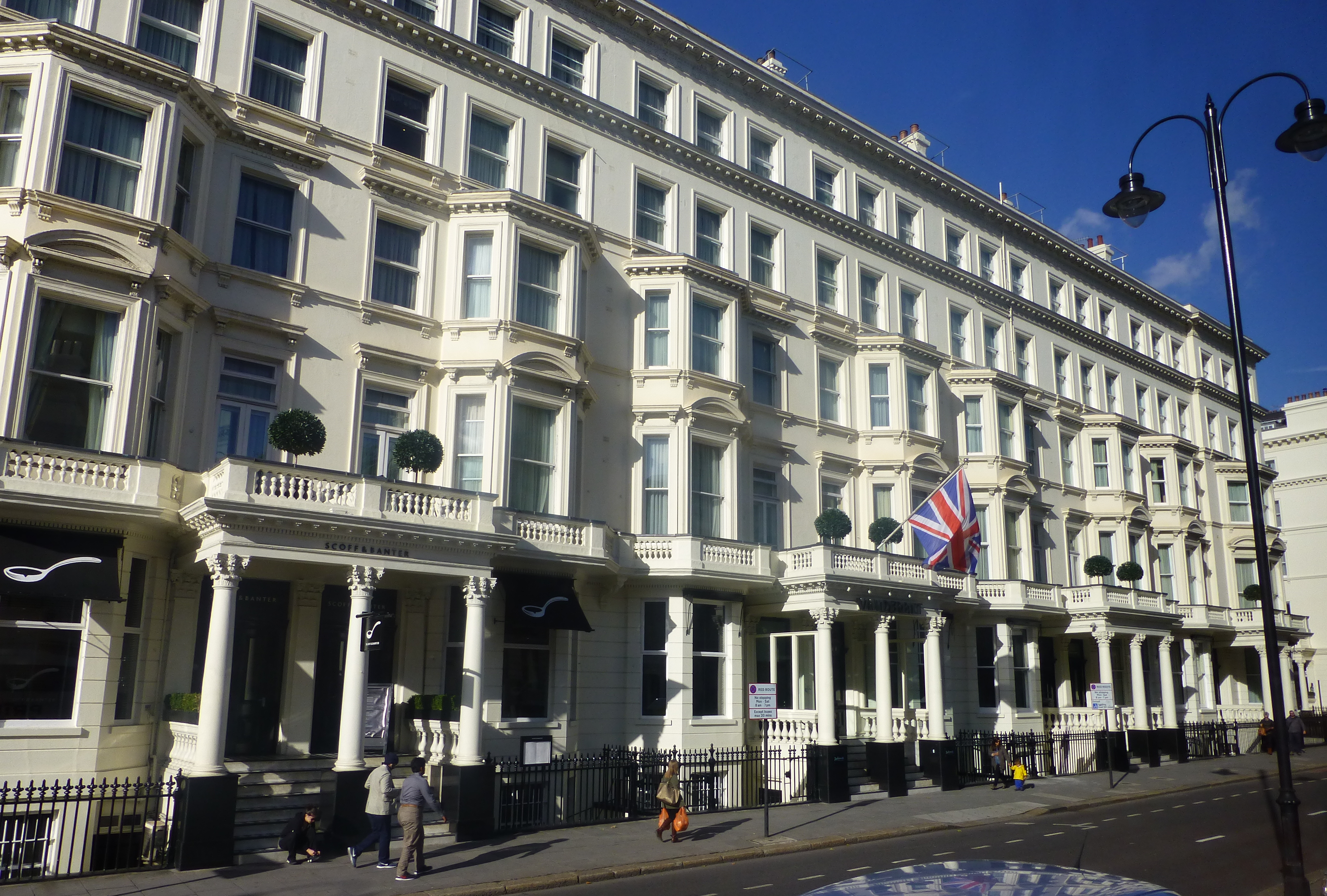

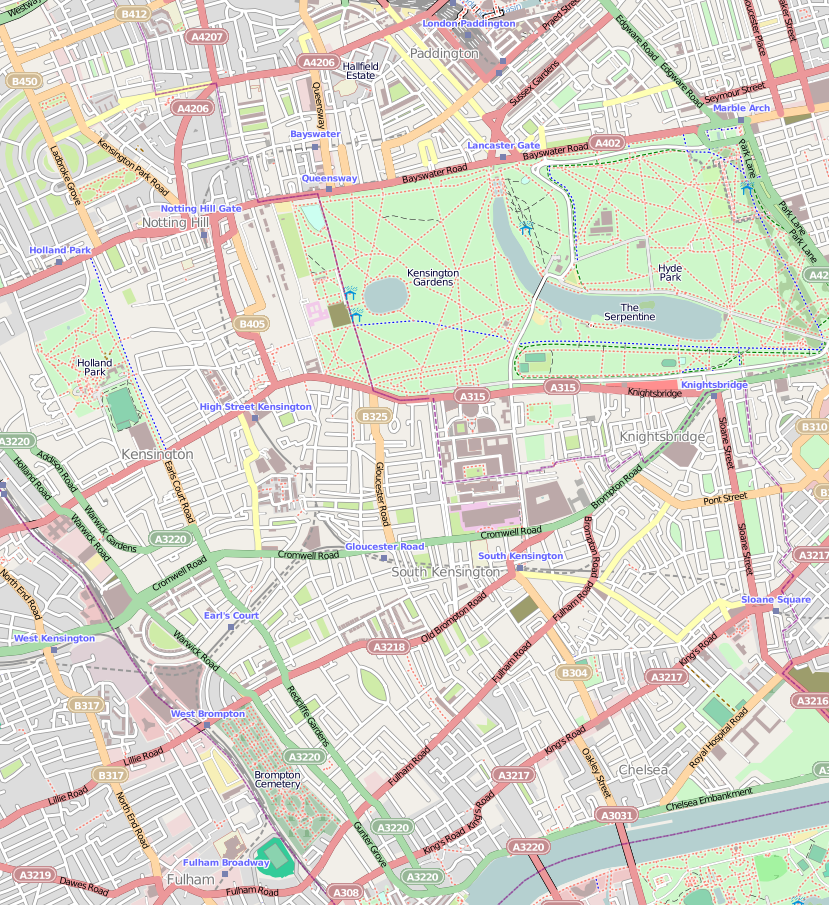
- Location within Kensington
- Hotel chain: Radisson Blu Edwardian

General information
- Location: 68–86 Cromwell Road; London, England
- Coordinates: 51°29′42″N 0°10′55″W
- Owner: Edwardian Hotels

Other information
- Number of rooms: 215

Website
- Official website

Listed Building – Grade II
- Official name: 68-86, Cromwell Road SW7, 40, Queens Gate Gardens SW7
- Designated: 7 November 1984
- Reference no.: 1358158

Radisson Blu Hotel, London South Kensington is a boutique hotel at 68–86 Cromwell Road in the Royal Borough of Kensington and Chelsea, central London. The hotel, located in a Grade II listed terrace of white stucco townhouses, contains 215 rooms and is part of the Radisson Hotels chain. The Scoff & Banter Kensington restaurant is situated on the ground floor.

== History ==
The hotel was purchased in 1978, and in 1993, Edwardian Hotels partnered with Radisson Hotels to become the Radisson Edwardian Hotels group. In 1998, the hotel was completely refurbished, and it became a four-star hotel. the hotel was included in the sale of ten Radisson Blu Edwardian properties in London by Edwardian Hotels to Starwood Capital Group. In April 2024, the portfolio came under the management of Axiom Hospitality.

Located in London's Royal Borough of Kensington and Chelsea, the hotel is 2,300 feet (700 m) from the Royal Albert Hall, and "less than five minutes’ walk from the Natural History Museum and the Science Museum."

== Architecture ==
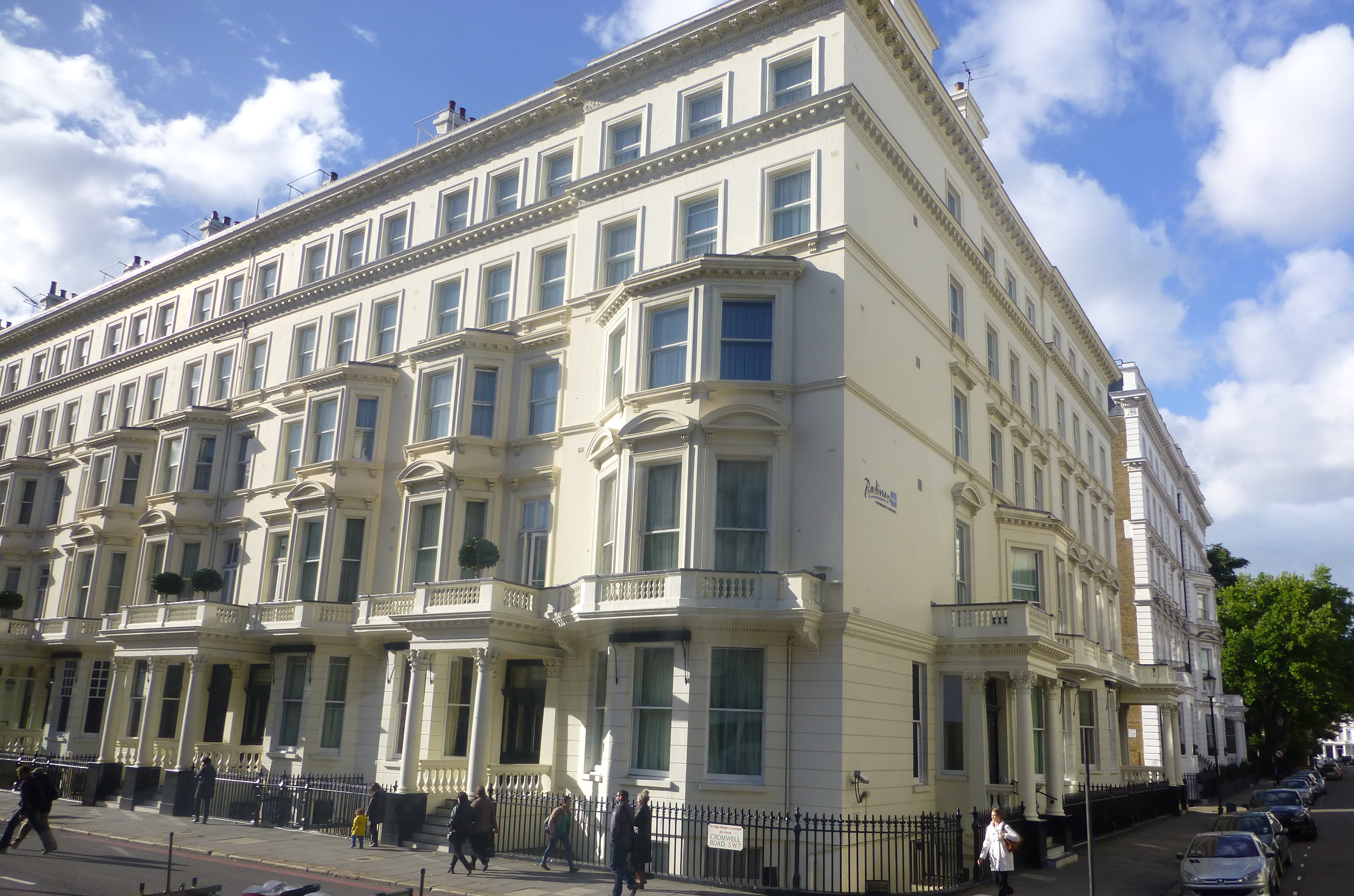
Exterior of the hotel

This Grade II listed building once served as a residence of the Vanderbilt family — 'American royalty' during the Gilded Age.

The hotel consists of ten townhouses combined into one building, and it contains frescoes, richly adorned ceilings, wood panelling and stained glass windows. The decor is described as being "minimalist", with "neutral grey, white and yellow tones". The lobby has a marble fireplace with a large stone statue of a hare, and a black-and-white tiled floor. The bedrooms contain handcrafted Vispring mattresses.

According to Architect Magazine, a retractable roof was added to the hotel's rooftop terrace in 2015 by Ettwein Bridges Architects and Tony Hogg Design Ltd., with Tenara Fabric and Sefar Architecture.

== Restaurant ==
The hotel contains the Scoff & Banter Kensington restaurant, formerly the 68–86 Bar and Restaurant, also known as Bar 86, an upmarket bar and restaurant that serves British cuisine with "Pacific Rim" influences. The interior has been described as having "wooden floors and unusual objects of art". The decor was refitted in 2014.
