= Radisson Blu Edwardian Heathrow Hotel =

Luxury hotel in west London, England

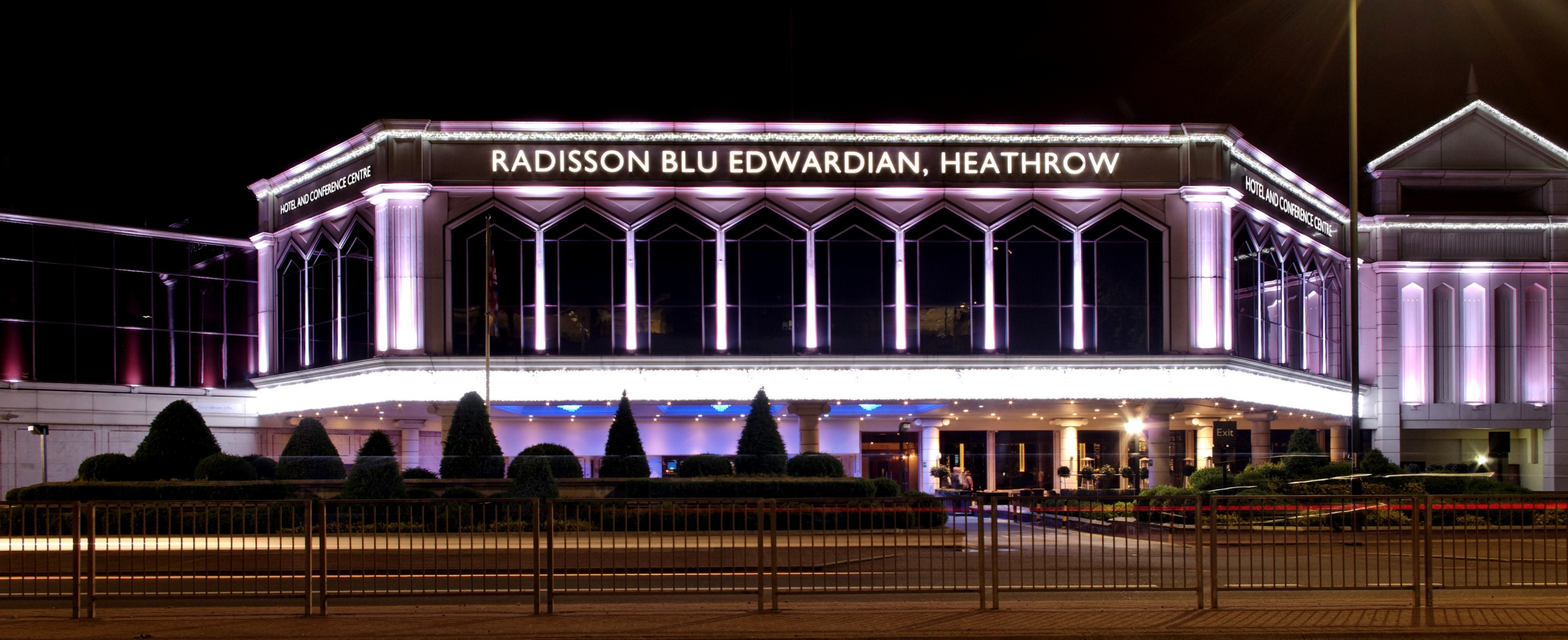

- Location within Greater London
- Hotel chain: Radisson Blu Edwardian

General information
- Location: 140 Bath Road, Hayes, London, England
- Coordinates: 51°28′54.05″N 0°26′29.29″W
- Owner: Edwardian Hotels

Other information
- Number of rooms: 459
- Number of suites: 17
- Number of restaurants: 2

Website
- Official website

Radisson Blu Edwardian Heathrow Hotel is a luxury hotel in west London, England. It is located at 140 Bath Road in Hayes, London Borough of Hillingdon, in close proximity to Heathrow Airport.

== History ==
The hotel opened in 1960 and was originally called the Skyway Hotel. It was purchased in 1989 by Edwardian Hotels, refurbished and renamed the Edwardian International. In 1990, it became the Radisson Edwardian Heathrow hotel and later the Radisson Blu Edwardian Heathrow Hotel. The Edwardian Hotels group considers the hotel to be its flagship property.

== Style and facilities ==
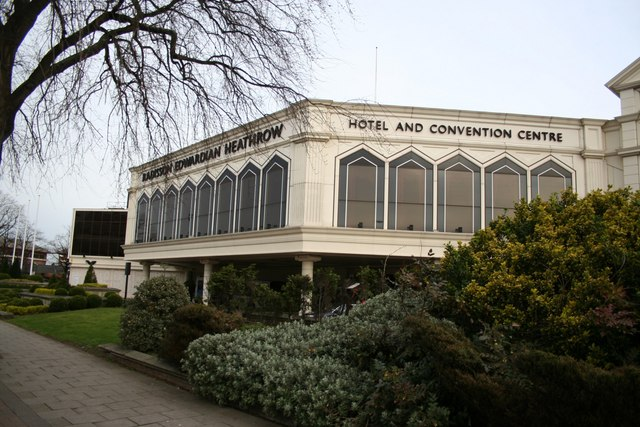
View of the exterior

According to Frommer's, the hotel is decorated in the Edwardian style with Persian rugs, brass-railed staircases, chandeliers and hand-painted hardwood furnishings. The bathrooms are marble in each of the 459 rooms. The hotel has 294 standard rooms, 17 suites, 101 deluxe rooms, and 47 single rooms.

The hotel has two restaurants and one bar – the Annayu Restaurant, which offers a blend of classic and contemporary Indian cuisine, the Steak & Lobster Restaurant, and the Bijou Lounge Bar.

The hotel contains the Pegasus Health Spa and Gym, which also provides beauty treatments and a dance studio. In addition, the hotel has a jewellery store and a newsagents.

Radisson Blu Edwardian Heathrow Hotel also functions as a conference centre, and it regularly hosts exhibitions, conventions, press conferences and weddings. It has 43 rooms allocated to this purpose, the largest of which has a capacity for 500 guests. On 25-27 March 2005, it hosted a Dawn of the Dead convention. On 21-24 March 2008, it hosted the Science Fiction Easter Convention.

== Reception ==
In 2010, Business Traveller magazine voted it the best airport hotel in the world.
