= Tetworth Hall =

Country house in Berkshire, England

Coordinates: 51.4121°N 0.6560°W

Tetworth Hall is a large country house between Ascot and Sunninghill in the English county of Berkshire.

It has been listed Grade II on the National Heritage List for England since March 1972. The former estate lodge of the hall is also listed Grade II. The house dates from the early 18th century, and a wing was built to extend the house to the west in the late 18th century. It is set over two storeys and basement. It was altered in the 19th century with the removal of the second floor and chimneys occurring in the mid-20th century. 24 acres of the Tetworth estate were sold in September 1933.

James Man, the founder of what became the Man Group, occupied Tetworth between 1798 and 1819. His wife, Sarah, died at the house in 1804. She is buried at the nearby church of St Michael and All Angels, Sunninghill, where the family held a pew.

It was the residence of the Lady Emma Harris, widow of Admiral Sir Edward Harris in the 1890s. She died at the house in 1896. The Liberal and Liberal Unionist politician Henry Frederick Beaumont lived at Tetworth in the 1910s. His son, Captain H.B. Beaumont, resided at the house in the 1920s. Arthur Noel, 4th Earl of Gainsborough and his wife Lady Alice, rented the house in August 1925. Christie's auction house held a sale of silver plate from Beaumont's estate at Tetworth in July 1931. It was bought by the Dowager Lady Buchanan Jardine of the Buchanan-Jardine baronets in 1932. She held a house warming party during the week of Royal Ascot in June 1932. The house was rented by Lady Dorothy Charteris, the wife of Evan Charteris for Royal Ascot in 1937. The rackets player and theatrical producer Kenneth Wagg and his wife, the industrial heiress Katherine Horlick, moved from the United States to live at Tetworth in 1939. The Conservative Party MP and croquet player William Baring du Pré bought Tetworth in November 1945. The property developer Rudolph Palumbo lived at Tetworth in the 1950s.

Lt-Col Robert Cradoc Rose Price, the brother of the actor Dennis Price, lived at Tetworth in the 1960s and 70s. Tetworth Hall was bought by the businessman and hotelier Jasminder Singh in the 20th century and has been the home of his extended family.
