= Marvin Sordell =

English footballer (born 1991)

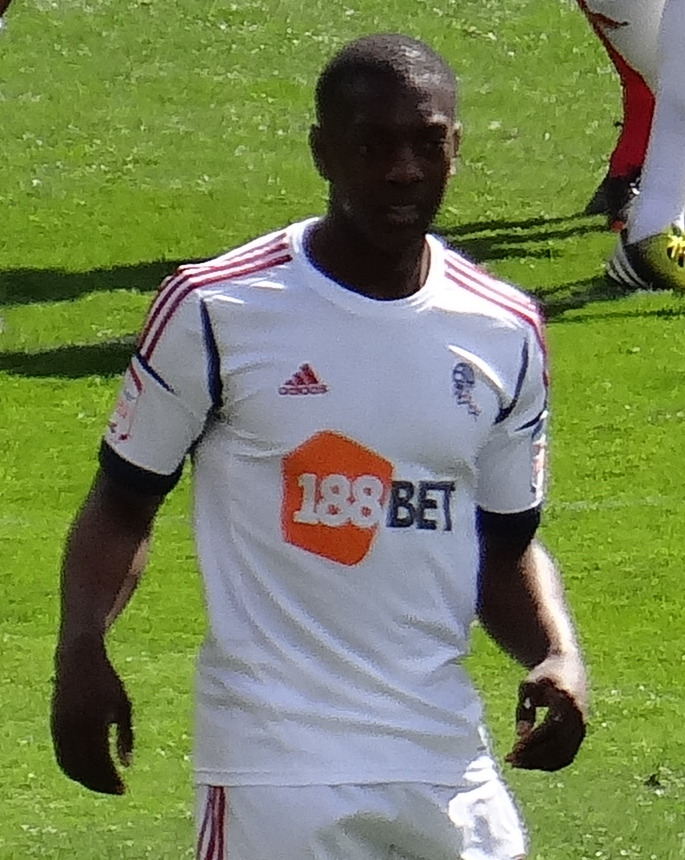
- Marvin Sordell playing for Bolton Wanderers in April 2013

Personal information
- Full name: Marvin Anthony Sordell
- Date of birth: 17 February 1991 (age 35)
- Place of birth: Pinner, England
- Height: 5 ft 10 in (1.78 m)
- Position: Forward

Team information
- Current team: Uxbridge

Youth career
- 2004–2007: Fulham
- 2007–2009: Watford

Senior career*
Years	Team	Apps	(Gls)
2009–2012	Watford	75	(21)
2008	→ Wealdstone (loan)	5	(2)
2010	→ Tranmere Rovers (loan)	8	(1)
2012–2013	Bolton Wanderers	25	(4)
2013–2014	→ Charlton Athletic (loan)	31	(7)
2014–2015	Burnley	17	(0)
2015–2016	Colchester United	21	(4)
2016–2017	Coventry City	20	(4)
2017–2019	Burton Albion	73	(9)
2019	→ Northampton Town (loan)	8	(0)
2024–2025	Kettering Town	3	(0)
2025	Rayners Lane	11	(5)
2025	AS London	1	(2)
2025–	Uxbridge	1	(0)

International career
2011	England U20	1	(1)
2011–2013	England U21	14	(3)
2012	Great Britain Olympic	3	(0)
- * Club domestic league appearances and goals as of 18:59, 8 December 2025 (UTC)

Marvin Anthony Sordell (born 17 February 1991) is an English footballer who plays as a forward for Southern League Premier Division South club Uxbridge.

Sordell started his career with Fulham prior to joining Watford for a two-year scholarship in 2007. He made his professional debut for the club during the 2009–10 season, and also had loan spell in League One with Tranmere Rovers the same season. After 27 goals in 81 games for Watford in two and a half years, Sordell earned a £3 million move to the Premier League with Bolton Wanderers in January 2012. He scored 8 goals in 29 appearances for the club, and spent the entirety of the 2013–14 season on loan at Charlton Athletic. He returned to the Premier League with Burnley for the 2014–15 season, but was mostly utilised as a substitute. After just one goal in 20 games for Burnley, his contract was cancelled in September 2015, where he went on to join League One club Colchester United, and at the end of the season Coventry City. After six months with Coventry, he moved to Burton Albion as part of a swap deal. Following a loan at Northampton Town, he retired aged 28 in 2019.

Sordell represented England at both under-20 and under-21 levels. He scored in his only game for the under-20s in February 2011, and scored three goals in 14 games for the under-21 side. He was also selected in Stuart Pearce's Great Britain squad for the London 2012 Summer Olympics. He made three appearances for the side.

== Club career ==
=== Early career ===
Born in Harrow, London, Sordell began playing football at the age of five for his local after-school football club, The Elms. He later joined a local youth team for a summer six-a-side tournament where he was selected as goalkeeper, conceding just one goal in the entire tournament as his side finished runners-up, losing 1–0 in the final.

Following his brief stint as a goalkeeper, he moved up front for the following year for St Joseph's Youth '88 Football Club. Here, he was named as the manager's Player of the Season, before finishing as the club's top-scorer two seasons later.

In his teenage years, Sordell went on trial with both Chelsea and Fulham. He joined Fulham and spent three years with the side, but was not offered a scholarship. He then attended the Football League exit trials, where he was offered a two-year scholarship with Watford.

=== Watford ===
After progressing through Watford's youth system from 2007 and featuring in their under-18 and reserve sides, Sordell linked up with Isthmian League Premier Division side Wealdstone on work experience in November 2008, making his debut in their 2–1 FA Trophy defeat by Tiverton Town on 1 November. He scored his first goal for the club after just 30 seconds of Wealdstone's game with Maidstone United on 15 November in a 3–2 victory. He scored twice in five league outings. At the end of the same season, Sordell was rewarded with his first professional contract, which he signed in April 2009.

==== 2009–10 season ====
Sordell made his professional debut for Watford in the 2009–10 season. He came on as a 72nd-minute substitute for Nathan Ellington in Watford's 2–0 defeat by Sheffield United at Bramall Lane on 15 August 2009. He scored his first goal in his third appearance for the club ten days later in a League Cup second round encounter with Leeds United. With Watford trailing 1–0, Sordell scored an equaliser in the 87th minute to take the tie to extra time, but his side went on to lose 2–1. He was rewarded with his first start for the club four days later on 29 August in Watford's 1–1 away draw at Swansea City.

==== Tranmere Rovers loan ====
Following his first start for Watford on 29 August 2009, Sordell was not involved in first-team football until February 2010, when he was loaned out to League One club Tranmere Rovers for and initial month. He made his Tranmere debut on 6 February as a substitute for Terry Gornell in their 1–0 home defeat to Oldham Athletic. He scored his first and only goal for the club on 20 February, scoring in a 2–1 win for Tranmere against Leyton Orient. His loan was extended for a second month on 2 March and made eight appearances in total for the club.

On his return to Watford, he made two further appearances for the first-team which included a goal in a 4–0 win over Coventry City on 2 May.

==== 2010–11 season ====
For the 2010–11 season, Sordell was a regular fixture in Malky Mackay's starting eleven. Sordell opened his account for the season with a goal in Watford's 3–0 win over Aldershot on 10 August 2010. He then scored four goals in the course of three games, beginning with both Watford's goals in their 2–2 Vicarage Road draw with Doncaster Rovers on 11 September after coming on as a substitute; the opener in their 2–0 win at Bristol City; and one of Watford's six goals in their 6–1 thrashing of Millwall on 18 September. He also scored in Championship wins at Sheffield United on 2 October and at home to Ipswich Town on 19 October.

Sordell failed to score for the remainder of October, all of November, and much of December before embarking on a scoring run of six goals in six games, beginning with a goal in Watford's 4–1 win at home to Cardiff City on 28 December. He also scored in their New Year's Day 2011 victory over Portsmouth, before scoring a brace against Hartlepool United as the Hornets dispatched their League One opponents 4–1 in the FA Cup third round on 8 January. His scoring form continued in a 3–0 win over Derby County and a 4–2 defeat away to Cardiff.

Sordell added his 14th and 15th goals of the campaign on 25 April in Watford's 4–2 defeat by Leicester City at the King Power Stadium. He ended his season with 46 first-team appearances.

==== 2011–12 season ====
Sordell scored his first goal of the 2011–12 season in Watford's League Cup penalty shootout exit against Bristol Rovers on 23 August 2011. He converted his spot kick having opened the scoring after just two minutes of normal time. He scored his second of the season on 28 August in Watford's 2–2 home draw with Birmingham City, before securing his third in the 1–1 draw with Barnsley on 17 September.

After six games without a goal, Sordell scored a brace in three first-half minutes on 29 October to help his side to a 3–2 win over Peterborough United. He scored in wins against Portsmouth on 19 November and Ipswich on 3 December, and then scored his second brace of the campaign on 31 December as Watford beat Doncaster 4–1.

Sordell scored his tenth goal of the season and what would be his final Watford goal on 7 January 2012 during the club's 4–2 FA Cup third round win at home to Bradford City. He was to make his last appearance in the fourth round of the competition as his side were defeated 1–0 by Premier League side Tottenham Hotspur at Vicarage Road. He scored 27 goals in 81 appearances for Watford in his two-and-a-half-year involvement with the first-team squad.

=== Bolton Wanderers ===
On transfer deadline day, 31 January 2012, Sordell signed a three-and-a-half-year deal with Premier League club Bolton Wanderers for a £3 million fee. Former Watford owner Laurence Bassini claimed in July 2019 he felt Bolton overpaid, and he personally refunded them several hundred thousand pounds. Sordell made his Premier League debut on 4 February as substitute for David Ngog, playing the final eight minutes of Bolton's 2–0 defeat to Norwich City at Carrow Road. He made just two further appearances during the season as Bolton were relegated to the Championship.

==== 2012–13 season ====
Sordell made his first start for Bolton in their opening game of the 2012–13 season as his side were defeated 2–0 against Burnley. He scored his first Bolton goal on 24 August in their 2–2 draw with Nottingham Forest at the Reebok Stadium. On 6 October, while warming up at Millwall, Sordell was racially abused by a 13-year-old who received a ban from The New Den as a punishment; a month later, six other Millwall fans unveiled a banner, for which they were arrested.

In the new year, manager Dougie Freedman told the press that Sordell was suffering from homesickness and abuse by Internet trolls since the events with Millwall. The manager said the striker was spending too much time on his social media accounts, and as a result they took his phone off him. He did not register his second goal until 5 January 2013, when Bolton held Sunderland to a 2–2 draw in the FA Cup third round. He then scored both goals in Bolton's 2–0 replay win at the Stadium of Light ten days later to hand his side a fourth round match against Everton. He scored against Everton on 26 January with his fifth goal of the season, but it wasn't enough to force a replay as John Heitinga won the match with a 90th-minute goal. He continued his scoring form against his former club Watford on 2 February, opening the scoring with a 32nd-minute penalty, but Watford fought back to snatch a 2–1 victory.

Sordell scored his seventh goal of the campaign on 30 March with the opening goal of a 3–2 defeat to Charlton Athletic at the Valley. He scored his eighth and final goal of the season on 20 April as Bolton defeated Middlesbrough 2–1. He made 26 appearances for the side over the season.

==== Charlton Athletic loan ====
Charlton Athletic signed Sordell in a season-long loan deal from Bolton on 1 August 2013. He made his debut in their 2–1 defeat to Bournemouth two days later in the opening game of the Championship season. He scored his first goal for Charlton on 27 August in their 3–2 League Cup defeat by Huddersfield Town, before scoring his first league goal for his new side on 1 October to secure a 1–1 home draw with Nottingham Forest.

Sordell didn't find the back of the net between the beginning of October until the beginning of February, when he scored an early goal against Wigan Athletic, but his side conceded two late goals to lose the fixture 2–1. His next goal arrived on 8 April, a goal which proved to be decisive as Charlton beat Yeovil Town 3–2. He scored his first professional hat-trick on 21 April in a 3–2 win at Sheffield Wednesday to boost his tally to seven goals for the season. He then scored his last goal of the season in his next match as Charlton were defeated 3–1 by visitors Blackburn Rovers. Sordell made 35 loan appearances for the Addicks in addition to his eight goals.

=== Burnley ===
Having previously played under Burnley boss Sean Dyche when they were both at Watford, Sordell signed for the newly promoted Premier League side on 4 July 2014 for an undisclosed fee from Bolton. He signed a three-year deal with his new side.

Sordell made his Burnley debut as a substitute for Danny Ings in their 3–1 home defeat by Chelsea on 18 August. He made his first start in their 1–0 League Cup defeat by Sheffield Wednesday on 26 August, but didn't make his first Premier League start until 20 September in Burnley's 0–0 draw with Sunderland at Turf Moor. He scored his first and what was to be his only Burnley goal on 14 January 2015 with the opening goal of Burnley's FA Cup third round exit against Tottenham at White Hart Lane.

Sordell made 17 league and cup appearances for the Clarets during the 2014–15 season and made just four substitute appearances for the club at the beginning of the 2015–16 season following their relegation from the Premier League to the Championship. His contract was terminated by mutual consent on 1 September 2015.

=== Colchester United ===
Following his release from Burnley, Sordell signed for League One side Colchester United on 10 September 2015 on a one-year contract. After making his debut in Colchester's 3–3 draw with Chesterfield two days after signing for the Essex club, Sordell scored his first goal for the side three days later with the winning goal in their 3–2 win against Sheffield United at Bramall Lane. On 29 September, he recorded his first club goal at the Colchester Community Stadium as the U's beat Bradford City 2–0. His third goal for Colchester proved to be the difference between his side and Port Vale as his side won 2–1 on 20 October. He then scored in Colchester's next game on 24 October, equalising at 2–2 during their 4–4 home draw with Walsall, before scoring his fifth goal for the club in Colchester's 6–2 FA Cup first round win over his former team Wealdstone on 7 November.

Sordell's next goal for the club did not arrive until 9 January 2016 in the third round of the FA Cup, scoring Colchester's second in their 2–1 win over Charlton Athletic after providing the assist for George Moncur's opener. After featuring for the U's in their fourth round FA Cup defeat to Tottenham Hotspur, Sordell suffered an ankle injury in training that required surgery. Sordell remained sidelined until the end of the season, meaning his season ended with six goals in 29 appearances for Colchester. It was announced at the end of the season that the club would not be offering Sordell a new contract following the expiry of his deal.

=== Coventry City ===
On 4 July 2016, Sordell joined fellow League One team Coventry City on a year-long contract. Manager Tony Mowbray said "He performed extremely well for Colchester in the first half of last season. He is still relatively young and I see plenty of potential for him to progress with us and make a positive impact."

He made his debut on 6 August as the season began with a 1–0 loss at Swindon Town, in which he was substituted at half time for Kyel Reid. On 10 September, he scored his first goal for the Sky Blues, a 25-yard strike to open their 1–1 draw at Millwall. Sordell totalled seven goals in 26 games for Coventry, including both in their 2–1 home win over Morecambe in the first round of the FA Cup on 15 November, and the sole strike of a win at the Ricoh Arena against Crawley Town on 7 December in the second round of the EFL Trophy, which the team ended up winning.

=== Burton Albion ===
On 1 January 2017, Sordell joined Championship side Burton Albion from Coventry in a swap deal that saw Stuart Beavon and Callum Reilly going in the opposite direction. He made his debut the next day in a 1–0 home loss to Preston North End, as a half-time substitute for Chris O'Grady. On 24 February he scored his first goal for the Brewers, netting from 20 yards to secure a draw with fellow strugglers Blackburn Rovers, also at the Pirelli Stadium. He finished his first term with the club with figures of 21 games and four goals, including a brace in the first half of a 5–3 defeat by Brentford on 18 March, as the Nigel Clough-led team defied odds to avoid relegation.

On 31 January 2019, Northampton Town signed Sordell on loan for the remainder of the 2018–19 season. On 26 July 2019, Sordell terminated his contract at Burton and retired from football at the age of 28. He mentioned his mental health as a reason to retire.

=== Non-League ===
On 23 September 2024, Sordell came out of retirement to join Southern League Premier Division Central side Kettering Town.

In February 2025, Sordell joined Rayners Lane.

In Autumn 2025, Sordell joined AS London. In November 2025, he joined Uxbridge.

== International career ==
=== England under-20s ===
Sordell was first capped by England at under-20 level for their friendly against France on 9 February 2011. The game was held at Shrewsbury Town's New Meadow stadium, with Sordell amongst the starting eleven. He scored England's only goal on his only appearance for the side as they were defeated 2–1 by France.

=== England under-21s ===
Sordell made his England under-21 debut as a substitute for Nathan Delfouneso on 1 September 2011 during the Young Lions' 6–0 2013 European Under-21 Championship qualifying win over Azerbaijan at his home ground, Watford's Vicarage Road stadium. He made a goalscoring first start for England four days later as his side beat Israel 4–1 in a friendly at Oakwell, Barnsley.

After featuring in Under-21 Championship qualifying wins against Iceland in Reykjavík and Norway in Drammen, Sordell scored his second England under-21 goal on 10 November at Colchester United's Community Stadium, scoring the opener as England beat Iceland 5–0 in the home encounter. He also started in both of England's games against Belgium during the 2011–12 season. He played in one final qualifying game ahead of the qualification play-offs in England's 2–0 win over Azerbaijan in Baku.

Sordell played in both England's play-off wins over Serbia in October 2012, but his next appearance didn't arrive until March 2013 when he replaced Raheem Sterling in England's 3–0 friendly win over Romania. After replacing Jonjo Shelvey during England's friendly with Austria in Brighton on 25 March, Sordell scored his third under-21 goal five minutes after coming on as England comfortably won 4–0.

During the 2013 European Under-21 Championship finals held in Israel, Sordell made his final two appearances for the side as England crashed out of the competition without a win in three games. He started in England's 1–0 defeat to Italy on 5 June, before making his 14th and final appearance as a substitute for Nathaniel Chalobah a 1–0 defeat by the hosts on 11 June.

=== Great Britain ===
Sordell was named as one of the 13 Englishmen and five Welshmen named in Stuart Pearce's Great Britain squad on 2 July 2012 ahead of the 2012 Summer Olympics held in London. He was a second-half substitute for Craig Bellamy in Great Britain's first match since 1971 in a pre-Olympic Games 2–0 friendly defeat by Brazil on 20 July 2012.

Sordell made a substitute appearance for Team GB during their 1–1 draw with Senegal at Old Trafford on 26 July, the side's first Olympic match since 1960. He struck the crossbar late on in the draw. He started in Great Britain's 3–1 win over United Arab Emirates on 29 July, but was replaced at half-time by Daniel Sturridge. He was an unused substitute in the win over Uruguay on 1 August and the penalty shootout defeat to South Korea on 4 August to send the side out of the tournament.

== Personal life ==
While en route to Belgrade for an England under-21 match in October 2012, Sordell downloaded an e-book to read on the journey, titled Trafficked, by Sophie Hayes. The book was about a young British woman who was forced to work in the sex trade in Italy against her will. Engrossed by the book, Sordell took to Twitter to recommend the book with his followers, and before long, Hayes got in touch with him to arrange a fund-raising event. Together with his sister Nicole's help, he set up a gala dinner, and established the Marvin Sordell Foundation. The Foundation helped raise money for charities fighting trafficking, and the first event in March 2013 earned more than £10,000 with 150 people in attendance at London's May Fair hotel.

In September 2018, Sordell spoke about his struggles with depression, including a 2013 suicide attempt. He cited his mental health when announcing his retirement in July 2019. In a 2020 BBC documentary about racism in football, Sordell said that racist abuse was a factor in his retirement. In September 2021, he spoke to the Home Affairs Select Committee and said that social media accounts should be personally identifiable in order to prevent harassment and abuse.

== Career statistics ==
As of 8 December 2025

Appearances and goals by club, season and competition
Club	Season	League			National Cup		League Cup		Other		Total	
Club	Season	Division	Apps	Goals	Apps	Goals	Apps	Goals	Apps	Goals	Apps	Goals
Watford	2008–09	Championship	0	0	0	0	0	0	—		0	0
Watford	2009–10	Championship	6	1	0	0	1	1	—		7	2
Watford	2010–11	Championship	43	12	2	2	2	1	—		47	15
Watford	2011–12	Championship	26	8	2	1	1	1	—		29	10
Watford	Total		75	21	4	3	4	3	—		83	27
Wealdstone (loan)	2008–09	Isthmian League Premier Division	5	2	—		—		1 (Note: Appearance in FA Trophy)	0	6	2
Tranmere Rovers (loan)	2009–10	League One	8	1	—		—		—		8	1
Bolton Wanderers	2011–12	Premier League	3	0	—		—		—		3	0
Bolton Wanderers	2012–13	Championship	22	4	3	4	1	0	—		26	8
Bolton Wanderers	Total		25	4	3	4	1	0	—		29	8
Charlton Athletic (loan)	2013–14	Championship	31	7	2	0	2	1	—		35	8
Burnley	2014–15	Premier League	14	0	2	1	1	0	—		17	1
Burnley	2015–16	Championship	3	0	—		1	0	—		4	0
Burnley	Total		17	0	2	1	2	0	—		21	1
Colchester United	2015–16	League One	21	4	4	2	—		—		25	6
Coventry City	2016–17	League One	20	4	3	2	0	0	3 (Note: Appearances in EFL Trophy)	1	26	7
Burton Albion	2016–17	Championship	21	4	—		—		—		21	4
Burton Albion	2017–18	Championship	40	3	1	0	2	0	—		43	3
Burton Albion	2018–19	League One	12	2	1	0	4	0	3	0	20	2
Burton Albion	Total		73	9	2	0	6	0	3	0	84	9
Northampton Town (loan)	2018–19	League Two	8	0	—		—		—		8	0
Kettering Town	2024–25	Southern League Premier Division Central	3	0	2	0	—		0	0	5	0
Rayners Lane	2024–25	Isthmian League South Central Division	11	5	0	0	—		2 (Note: Appearance(s) in Middlesex Senior Cup)	1	13	6
AS London	2025–26	Eastern Counties League Division One South	1	2	0	0	—		0	0	1	2
Uxbridge	2025–26	Southern League Premier Division South	1	0	0	0	—		0	0	1	0
Career total			299	59	22	12	15	4	9	2	345	77
