= Grafton Hotel =

English hotel

Coordinates: 51.5242°N 0.1379°W

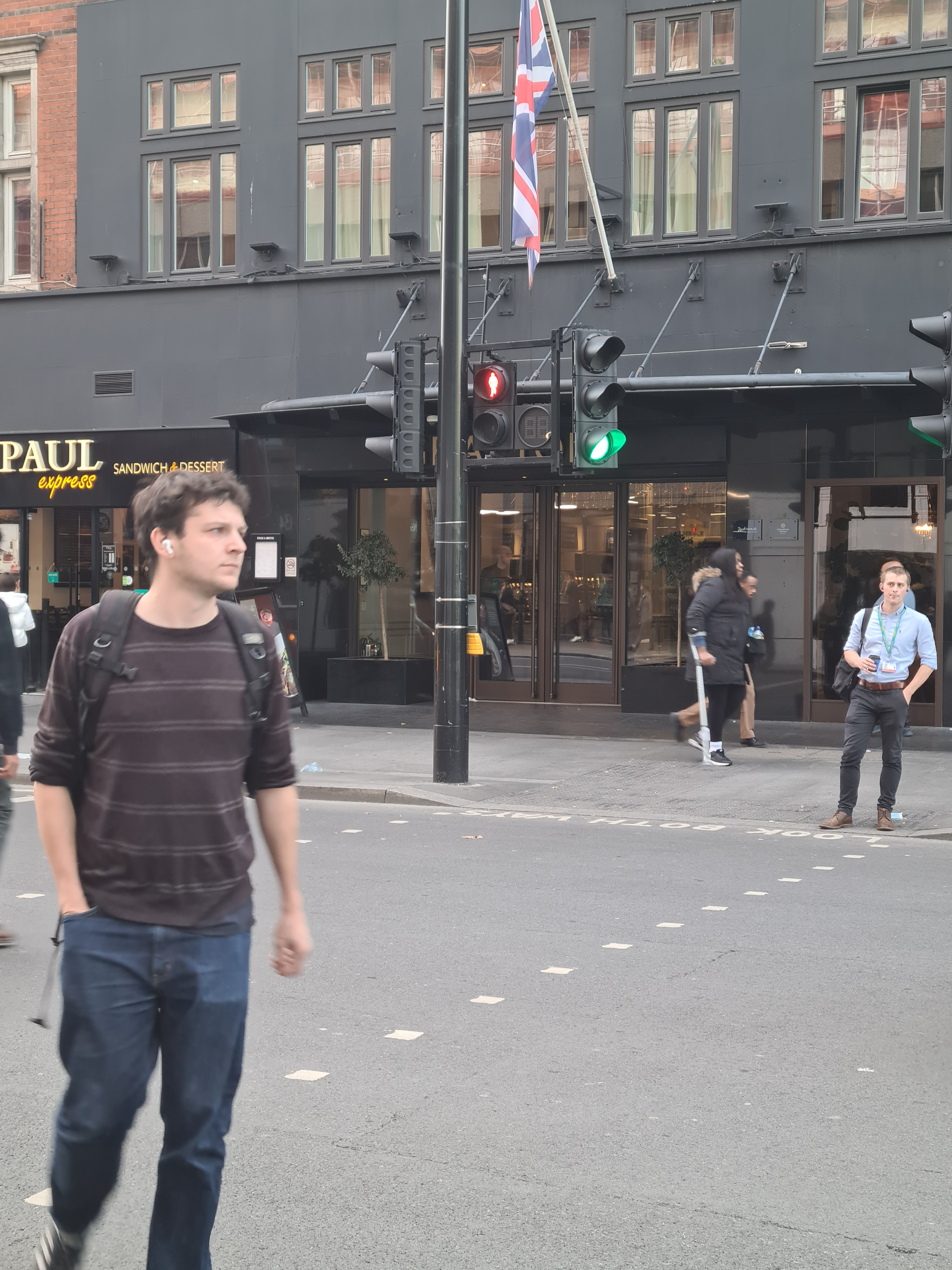
Exterior of the hotel in 2022

The Grafton Hotel at 130 Tottenham Court Road in Fitzrovia, London, is part of the Edwardian Hotels group. In a partnership with Radisson Hotels, it is branded as the Radisson Blu Edwardian Grafton Hotel.

The hotel was built in the Edwardian era and has 330 rooms. The building was designed by the architect William Howard Seth-Smith, FRIBA, and upon opening was furnished by Maple and Co. Shortly before opening, the hotel was advertised as being run on "popular lines".

During World War II, the hotel was used as the temporary headquarters for the Ministry of Food. From October 1939 to April 1940, Albert Meems, "one of very few German agents who successfully moved in and out of the UK during the Second World War without being detected", made four visits to London and always stayed at the Grafton Hotel.
