= Albert Meems =

Dutch spy for Germany in WWII

Albert Meems (28 February 1888, Nieuw-Buinen – after 1957, possibly in India) was a Dutch spy for Germany in the Second World War, "one of very few German agents who successfully moved in and out of the UK during the Second World War without being detected".

Meems was the son of Okko Meems and Hindekien Veentjer, factory workers in Borger. In the 1930s and during the war, Meems lived in Hanover.

He spent a lot of time in India where he worked as a livestock dealer sourcing animals for European zoos.

Meems worked as a spy for Germany in the First World War and re-enlisted as part of 'Nest Bremen' in 1938. Nest Bremen was an outpost of Hamburg Abwehr.

Reference is made to Meems in The New York Times of 4 June 1922 when a consignment of "elephants, baboons and snakes" valued at more than US$100,000 arrived by ship. Meems is described as "a trapper and hunter of wide experience" who put the shipment together. He was reported as having gathered the animals during a one-year expedition in Burma.

== Second World War ==
From October 1939 to April 1940, Meems, who had the nickname "Dickert" ("fatty") made four visits to London, and always stayed at the Grafton Hotel in Tottenham Court Road.

It was not until 1944 that Meems' work came to the attention of MI5 after other members of Nest Bremen were captured.

After interrogation one of his commanders described Meems as, "...clumsy, bluff, half-educated fellow who spoke English, German and Dutch all mixed together – a most amusing and companionable man with an endless fund of tales on the tricks of his trade".

Another colleague, Emil Genue, said of Meems -

Hair greying. Red face. Blue bulging eyes. Square hunched shoulders, so that, with his bull neck, his head appears sunk between them. Appearance of a toad... Walks like a pregnant woman, to carry his fat. Pants at the least effort. Carelessly dressed. Ready tied ties. Several rings on his pudgy fingers."

— Emil Genue

In 1942 Meems was dispatched to India but was unable to journey further than Belgrade. Then in 1944 an FBI file notes that Meems was sent with another agent to Antwerp in order to establish a radio station, "which they failed to do". They were also tasked with giving an agent named De Kerr a radio set but "they were unable to do this because they could not locate him".

He was arrested in 1945 in the American Sector of Berlin at the age of 57.

== Later life ==
On June 15, 1949, a special court in The Hague found Meems not guilty beyond doubt of the accusations levelled against him and he was set free.

It appears that Meems returned to India: The Norwalk Hour of 29 May 1957 reported that the Darien-Mercara (India) Committee were going to gift an elephant from Darien to the children of Mercara. The article states that Albert Meems, animal exporter of Mysore, described the selected elephant as 'a very nice animal'.

His younger brother A.B. Meems (August or Aike Berend Meems, *11 May 1891) was also a German collaborator and spy. For being a Verwalter (a person who took over leadership of expropriated companies, mostly of Jewish owners), Aike was sentenced to 5 years prison on May 29, 1949. He died 19 March 1955 shortly after his release.
