= Matthew Whichelow =

English-born Montserratian footballer

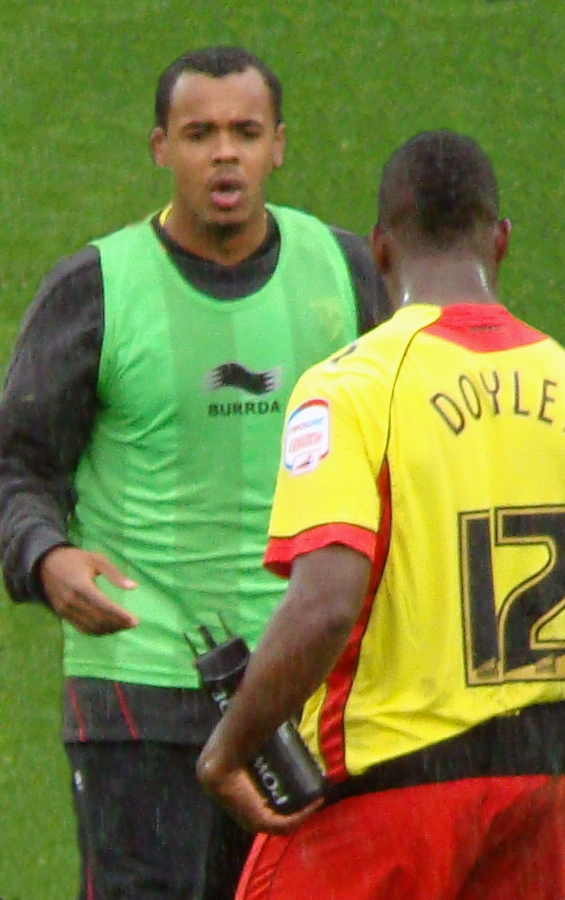
- Whichelow (left) in 2012

Personal information
- Full name: Matthew Robert Whichelow
- Date of birth: 28 September 1991 (age 35)
- Place of birth: Islington, England
- Position: Winger

Team information
- Current team: Welwyn Garden City

Youth career
- –2010: Watford

Senior career*
Years	Team	Apps	(Gls)
2010–2013	Watford	21	(3)
2011	→ Exeter City (loan)	2	(0)
2012	→ Wycombe Wanderers (loan)	4	(1)
2012	→ Accrington Stanley (loan)	4	(0)
2013–2016	Boreham Wood	76	(13)
2015–2016	→ Chelmsford City (loan)	12	(4)
2016	→ Oxford City (loan)	16	(4)
2016–2018	Wealdstone	59	(10)
2018–2019	Hampton & Richmond Borough	19	(3)
2020	Kings Langley	1	(1)
2023–2024	Kings Langley	5	(0)
2024–	Welwyn Garden City	0	(0)

International career^{‡}
2019–2021	Montserrat	5	(0)
- * Club domestic league appearances and goals as of 19:15, 8 March 2020 (UTC) ‡ National team caps and goals as of 20:36, 29 March 2021 (UTC)

Matthew Robert Whichelow (born 28 September 1991) is an English-born Montserratian semi-professional footballer who plays as a winger for Welwyn Garden City FC

== Career ==
=== Club career ===
Whichelow was born in Islington, London. He made his Championship debut for Watford against Scunthorpe United on 23 October 2010 as a late substitute, and again came on at half time in the match against Derby County on 30 October 2010, scoring his first professional goal within ten minutes. Whichelow featured for Watford 17 more times during the 2010–11 season, which included 4 starts and 2 goals.

Having missed most of pre-season for Watford, Whichelow joined Exeter City on loan on 16 September 2011 for a month to gain match fitness. Whichelow came on for Watford in the second half against Tottenham Hotspur in the FA Cup on 27 January to make only his second appearance for Watford all season. He was however loaned out again, this time to Wycombe Wanderers on a one-month youth loan deal on 31 January 2012. He scored on his debut against Tranmere Rovers.

Whichelow was then loaned to League Two club Accrington Stanley on a month's loan in September 2012. His loan was extended into a second and third month, where he made a total of 4 appearances. He returned to parent club Watford on 20 December.

On 4 February 2013, Watford confirmed that Whichelow had been released by mutual consent. He spent the last few months of the 2012–13 season training with Forest Green Rovers and in July 2013 spent time on trial with Braintree Town. He joined Boreham Wood in August 2013. He made his debut on 17 August 2013 in a 2–0 win against Tonbridge Angels. On 16 October 2015, Whichelow joined Chelmsford City on a three-month loan deal. Whichelow scored twice on his debut for Chelmsford City in a 1–2 victory away at Basingstoke Town.

On 7 March 2020, he signed for Kings Langley., making one appearance before re-joining in the 2023-24 season after a period away from playing.

Whichelow joined Welwyn Garden City for the 2024-25 season.

=== International career ===
Whichelow was called up by Montserrat in October 2019, making his debut against the Dominican Republic.

== Career statistics ==
=== Club ===
As of match played 7 March 2020

Appearances and goals by club, season and competition
Club	Season	League			FA Cup		League Cup		Other		Total	
Club	Season	Division	Apps	Goals	Apps	Goals	Apps	Goals	Apps	Goals	Apps	Goals
Watford	2010–11	Championship	19	3	2	0	0	0	—		21	3
Watford	2011–12	Championship	2	0	1	0	0	0	—		3	0
Watford	Total		21	3	3	0	0	0	—		24	3
Exeter City (loan)	2011–12	League One	2	0	—		—		1 (Note: Appearance in Football League Trophy)	0	3	0
Wycombe Wanderers (loan)	2011–12	League One	4	1	—		—		—		4	1
Accrington Stanley (loan)	2012–13	League Two	4	0	—		—		—		4	0
Boreham Wood	2013–14	Conference South	30	4	1	0	—		0	0	31	4
Boreham Wood	2014–15	Conference South	37	8	1	0	—		3 (Note: Appearances in Conference South play-offs)	0	41	8
Boreham Wood	2015–16	National League	9	1	0	0	—		0	0	9	1
Boreham Wood	Total		76	13	2	0	—		3	0	81	13
Chelmsford City (loan)	2015–16	National League South	12	4	0	0	—		1 (Note: Appearances in the FA Trophy)	0	13	4
Oxford City (loan)	2015–16	National League South	16	4	0	0	—		0	0	16	4
Wealdstone	2016–17	National League South	32	3	1	1	—		2	0	35	4
Wealdstone	2017–18	National League South	27	7	0	0	—		4	1	31	8
Wealdstone	Total		59	10	1	1	0	0	6	1	66	12
Hampton & Richmond Borough	2018–19	National League South	19	3	0	0	—		0	0	19	3
Kings Langley	2019–20	SFL Premier Division Central	1	1	0	0	—		0	0	1	1
Career total			214	39	6	1	0	0	11	1	231	41

=== International ===
As of match played 28 March 2021

Appearances and goals by national team and year
National team	Year	Apps	Goals
Montserrat	2019	3	0
Montserrat	2021	2	0
Total		5	0

== Honours ==
Boreham Wood

- Conference South play-offs: 2014–15
