= Edwardian Hotels =

Hotel company

- Industry: Hospitality
- Founded: 1977
- Headquarters: United Kingdom
- Key people: Jasminder Singh, OBE (Chairman & CEO)
- Website: edwardian.com

Edwardian Hotels is a British hotel company, which was founded by Jasminder Singh in 1977. The company has 13 hotels, mostly located in central London, England.

Notable properties include The May Fair Hotel, a 404-room building that was purchased from InterContinental Hotels Group in 2003.

In 1993, Edwardian Hotels partnered with Radisson Hotels. Several of the company's properties were rebranded as Radisson Blu hotels, including the Radisson Blu Edwardian Heathrow Hotel, the Radisson Blu Edwardian Vanderbilt Hotel, the Radisson Blu Edwardian Grafton Hotel and the Radisson Blu Edwardian Hampshire Hotel.
