= The May Fair Hotel =

Luxury hotel in London, England

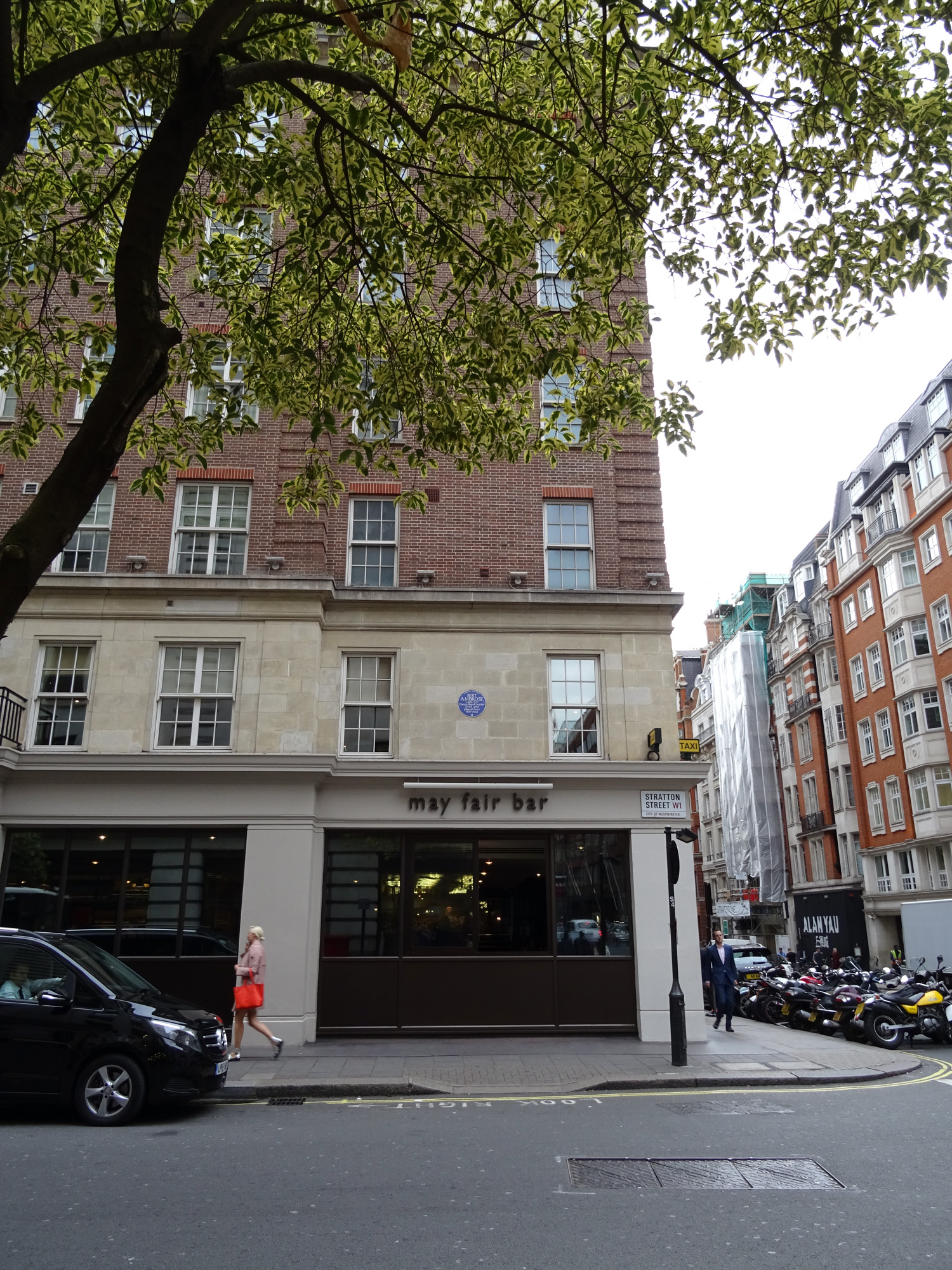

- Location within Central London
- Hotel chain: Radisson Collection

General information
- Location: Mayfair, London, England
- Coordinates: 51°30′29″N 0°8′38″W
- Owner: Edwardian Hotels
- Operator: Edwardian Group London

Other information
- Number of rooms: 404

Website
- themayfairhotel.co.uk

The May Fair Hotel is a luxury hotel on Stratton Street in Mayfair, London, near the site of Devonshire House in Piccadilly. It opened in 1927 with King George V and Queen Mary in attendance. The hotel is now owned by Edwardian Hotels, and Inderneel Singh, son of the chairman and CEO Jasminder Singh, is the managing director.

The 404-room hotel completed a $150 million renovation in November 2006. The building also houses the May Fair Theatre, which opened in 1963.

In 2005, a blue plaque was unveiled to commemorate dance band leader Ambrose, who performed regularly at the hotel. Eric Parkin was a cocktail pianist there in the 1940s.

In June 2019, the hotel joined the Radisson Collection brand.
