= 2005–06 Watford F.C. season =

English football team season

Watford F.C.
2005–06 season
- Chairman: Graham Simpson
- Manager: Aidy Boothroyd
- Stadium: Vicarage Road
- Championship: 3rd (qualified for play-offs)
- Play-offs: Winners
- FA Cup: Third round
- League Cup: Third round
- Top goalscorer: League: Marlon King (21); All: Marlon King (22)
- Highest home attendance: 19,842 vs Coventry City (11 Feb 2006, Championship)
- Lowest home attendance: 7,011 vs Notts County (23 Aug 2005, League Cup)
- Average home league attendance: 15,415

During the 2005–06 English football season, Watford competed in the Football League Championship.

== Season summary ==
Against the odds, Watford managed to gain promotion to the Premier League through the play-offs, defeating Leeds United 3–0 in the play-off final to return to the top flight after an absence of six years. Crucial to Watford's promotion was striker Marlon King, who was the Championship's top scorer. Striker Darius Henderson and young winger Ashley Young also chipped in with 15 and 14 league goals respectively; between them, the three scored 51 of the club's 77 goals scored in the league.

== Final league table ==
Pos	Team	Pld	W	D	L	GF	GA	GD	Pts	Promotion, qualification or relegation
1	Reading (C, P)	46	31	13	2	99	32	+67	106	Promotion to the FA Premier League
2	Sheffield United (P)	46	26	12	8	76	46	+30	90	Promotion to the FA Premier League
3	Watford (O, P)	46	22	15	9	77	53	+24	81	Qualification for Championship play-offs
4	Preston North End	46	20	20	6	59	30	+29	80	Qualification for Championship play-offs
5	Leeds United	46	21	15	10	57	38	+19	78	Qualification for Championship play-offs

Updated to match(es) played on 2 December 2011. Source: RSSSF
Rules for classification: 1) points; 2) goal difference; 3) number of goals scored.
(C) Champions; (O) Play-off winners; (P) Promoted

== Results ==
Watford's score comes first

=== Legend ===
Win	Draw	Loss

=== Football League Championship ===
Date	Opponent	Venue	Result	Attendance	Scorers
6 August 2005	Preston North End	H	1–2	12,597	Henderson
9 August 2005	Plymouth Argyle	A	3–3	13,813	King, Young (2)
12 August 2005	Cardiff City	A	3–1	10,102	King (2), Henderson
20 August 2005	Burnley	H	3–1	16,802	King, Mahon, Spring
27 August 2005	Reading	H	0–0	12,152	
29 August 2005	Derby County	A	2–1	23,664	Spring, Carlisle
10 September 2005	Stoke City	A	3–0	14,565	Devlin, Young, King (pen)
13 September 2005	Norwich City	H	2–1	13,502	King, Young
17 September 2005	Sheffield United	H	2–3	15,399	Henderson (2)
24 September 2005	Crewe Alexandra	A	0–0	6,258	
28 September 2005	Coventry City	A	1–3	16,978	Young
1 October 2005	Leeds United	H	0–0	16,050	
15 October 2005	Leicester City	H	1–2	16,224	Young
18 October 2005	Sheffield Wednesday	A	1–1	21,187	Young
22 October 2005	Ipswich Town	A	1–0	24,069	Young
29 October 2005	Wolverhampton Wanderers	H	3–1	14,561	DeMerit, King, Devlin
1 November 2005	Queens Park Rangers	H	3–1	16,476	Spring, McNamee, Young
5 November 2005	Hull City	A	2–1	18,444	Mahon, Spring
19 November 2005	Sheffield Wednesday	H	2–1	16,988	Carlisle, King
22 November 2005	Leicester City	A	2–2	18,856	King, Mackay
26 November 2005	Preston North End	A	1–1	14,638	Spring
3 December 2005	Brighton & Hove Albion	H	1–1	14,455	King
10 December 2005	Plymouth Argyle	H	1–1	12,884	King
17 December 2005	Burnley	A	1–4	13,815	King
26 December 2005	Southampton	H	3–0	16,972	Henderson, Carlisle, Hajto (own goal)
28 December 2005	Millwall	A	0–0	8,450	
31 December 2005	Crystal Palace	H	1–2	15,856	Henderson
2 January 2006	Luton Town	A	2–1	10,248	Henderson, Mackay
14 January 2006	Stoke City	H	1–0	12,247	Eagles
21 January 2006	Norwich City	A	3–2	25,384	Henderson (2), Spring
28 January 2006	Crewe Alexandra	H	4–1	11,722	Spring (2), King, Young
6 February 2006	Sheffield United	A	4–1	20,791	Eagles, King (2), Bouazza
11 February 2006	Coventry City	H	4–0	19,842	Young, King, Henderson, DeMerit
14 February 2006	Leeds United	A	1–2	22,007	Young
18 February 2006	Brighton & Hove Albion	A	1–0	6,658	Eagles
25 February 2006	Cardiff City	H	2–1	17,419	Mackay, King
4 March 2006	Derby County	H	2–2	16,769	King, Bangura
11 March 2006	Reading	A	0–0	23,724	
20 March 2006	Southampton	A	3–1	19,202	Mahon, Henderson (2)
25 March 2006	Millwall	H	0–2	16,654	
31 March 2006	Crystal Palace	A	1–3	18,619	King
9 April 2006	Luton Town	H	1–1	15,922	King
14 April 2006	Wolverhampton Wanderers	A	1–1	22,584	King
17 April 2006	Ipswich Town	H	2–1	16,721	Henderson (2)
22 April 2006	Queens Park Rangers	A	2–1	16,152	Young, Santos (own goal)
30 April 2006	Hull City	H	0–0	19,041	

=== Championship play-offs ===
Round	Date	Opponent	Venue	Result	Attendance	Goalscorers
SF 1st Leg	6 May 2006	Crystal Palace	A	3–0	22,880	King, Young, Spring
SF 2nd Leg	9 May 2006	Crystal Palace	H	0–0 (won 3–0 on agg)	19,041	
F	21 May 2006	Leeds United	N	3–0	64,736	DeMerit, Sullivan (own goal), Henderson (pen)

=== FA Cup ===
Round	Date	Opponent	Venue	Result	Attendance	Goalscorers
R3	7 January 2006	Bolton Wanderers	H	0–3	13,239	

=== League Cup ===
Round	Date	Opponent	Venue	Result	Attendance	Goalscorers
R1	23 August 2005	Notts County	H	3–1	7,011	Young, Bouazza (pen), Blizzard
R2	20 September 2005	Wolverhampton Wanderers	H	2–1	9,296	Carlisle (2)
R3	25 October 2005	Wigan Athletic	A	0–3	4,531	

== Players ==
=== First-team squad ===
Squad at end of season

Note: Flags indicate national team as defined under FIFA eligibility rules; some limited exceptions apply. Players may hold more than one non-FIFA nationality.

No.	Pos.	Nation	Player
1	GK	ENG	Alec Chamberlain
2	DF	ENG	James Chambers
3	DF	ENG	Jordan Stewart
4	DF	SCO	Malky Mackay
5	DF	ENG	Clarke Carlisle
6	DF	USA	Jay DeMerit
7	MF	ENG	Chris Eagles (on loan from Manchester United)
8	MF	ENG	Gavin Mahon (captain)
9	FW	JAM	Marlon King (Note: King was born in Dulwich, England, but also qualified to represent Jamaica internationally and made his international debut for Jamaica in 2004.)
12	DF	ENG	Lloyd Doyley (Note: Doyley was born in Tower Hamlets, England, but also qualified to represent Jamaica internationally and would make his international debut for Jamaica in March 2013.)
14	MF	ENG	Dominic Blizzard
15	MF	ENG	Ashley Young
18	FW	FRA	Hameur Bouazza (Note: Bouazza was born in Évry, France, but also qualified to represent Algeria internationally through his parents and would make his international debut for Algeria in February 2007.)
19	MF	ENG	Anthony McNamee
20	MF	SLE	Al Bangura

No.	Pos.	Nation	Player
21	MF	FRA	Toumani Diagouraga
22	DF	ENG	Junior Osborne
23	DF	ENG	Adrian Mariappa (Note: Mariappa was born in Harrow, England, but also qualified to represent Fiji internationally through his father and Jamaica internationally through his maternal grandparents and would make his international debut for Jamaica in June 2012.)
25	MF	ENG	Matthew Spring
26	GK	ENG	Ben Foster (on loan from Manchester United)
27	MF	JAM	Joel Grant (Note: Grant was born in Ealing, England, but also qualified to represent Jamaica internationally and represented them at U-23 level before making his international debut for Jamaica in May 2014.)
28	FW	JAM	Francino Francis
29	FW	ENG	Darius Henderson
30	MF	FRA	Marvin Homand
31	MF	ENG	Alex Campana
32	FW	ENG	Les Ferdinand
34	DF	ENG	Ben Gill
35	DF	ENG	Joe O'Cearuill (Note: O'Cearuill was born in Enfield, England, but also qualified to represent the Republic of Ireland internationally and represented them at U-21 and B level before making his international debut for the Republic of Ireland in May 2007.)
36	FW	ENG	Theo Robinson (Note: Robinson was born in Birmingham, England, but also qualified to represent Jamaica internationally and would make his international debut for Jamaica in February 2013.)

=== Left club during season ===
Note: Flags indicate national team as defined under FIFA eligibility rules; some limited exceptions apply. Players may hold more than one non-FIFA nationality.

No.	Pos.	Nation	Player
7	MF	ENG	Martin Devaney (to Barnsley)
7	MF	WAL	Carl Fletcher (Note: Fletcher was born in Camberley, England, but also qualified to represent Wales internationally and made his international debut for Wales in 2004.) (on loan from West Ham United)
10	MF	SCO	Paul Devlin (Note: Devlin was born in Birmingham, England, but also qualified to represent Scotland internationally through his father and made his international debut for Scotland in October 2002.) (to Walsall)
11	DF	ESP	Sietes (released)
16	GK	ENG	Richard Lee (on loan to Blackburn Rovers)
17	MF	ENG	Jamie Hand (to Fisher Athletic)

No.	Pos.	Nation	Player
24	DF	AUS	Adam Griffiths (to Bournemouth)
25	FW	BRA	José Júnior (to Odense)
33	FW	JAM	Trevor Benjamin (Note: Benjamin was born in Kettering, England, and represented England at U-21 level, but also qualified to represent Jamaica internationally and made his international debut for Jamaica in November 2002.) (on loan from Peterborough United)
36	FW	ENG	Gabriel Agbonlahor (on loan from Aston Villa)
50	GK	BEL	Yves Ma-Kalambay (Note: Ma-Kalambay was born in Brussels, Belgium, and represented them at U-23 level, but also qualified to represent the Democratic Republic of the Congo internationally through his father and would make his international debut for Democratic Republic of the Congo in May 2010.) (on loan from Chelsea)
—	MF	ENG	Ryan Gilligan (to Swindon Town)

== Statistics ==
=== Appearances, goals and cards ===
(Starting appearances + substitute appearances)

No.	Pos.	Name	League		FA Cup		League Cup		Play-offs		Total		Discipline	
No.	Pos.	Name	Apps	Goals	Apps	Goals	Apps	Goals	Apps	Goals	Apps	Goals	Yellow card	Red card
1	GK	(England) Alec Chamberlain	2+1	0	0	0	3	0	0	0	5+1	0	0	0
2	DF	(England) James Chambers	26+12	0	0	0	2+1	0	3	0	31+13	0	7	0
3	DF	(England) Jordan Stewart	29+6	0	1	0	2	0	3	0	35+6	0	4	0
4	DF	(Scotland) Malky Mackay	35+3	3	1	0	1	0	3	0	40+3	3	4	1
5	DF	(England) Clarke Carlisle	30+2	3	1	0	2	2	0	0	33+2	5	5	1
6	DF	(United States) Jay DeMerit	27+5	2	0	0	2	0	3	1	32+5	3	4	0
7	MF	(England) Chris Eagles	16+1	3	1	0	0	0	0+1	0	17+2	3	1	0
7	MF	(Wales) Carl Fletcher	3	0	0	0	0	0	0	0	3	0	1	0
8	MF	(England) Gavin Mahon	35+3	3	1	0	1	0	3	0	40+3	3	5	0
9	FW	(Jamaica) Marlon King	40+1	21	1	0	0	0	3	1	44+1	22	2	1
10	MF	(Scotland) Paul Devlin	21+2	2	0	0	0	0	0	0	21+2	2	2	0
12	DF	(England) Lloyd Doyley	40+4	0	1	0	2	0	3	0	46+4	0	3	0
14	MF	(England) Dominic Blizzard	9+1	0	0	0	1	1	0	0	10+1	1	0	0
15	MF	(England) Ashley Young	38+1	13	0	0	1	1	3	1	42+1	15	3	1
18	FW	(France) Hameur Bouazza	3+11	1	0	0	2	1	0+1	0	5+12	2	0	0
19	DF	(England) Anthony McNamee	26+12	1	1	0	3	0	0	0	30+12	1	1	0
20	MF	(Sierra Leone) Al Bangura	11+24	1	0	0	3	0	1+2	0	15+26	1	6	0
21	MF	(France) Toumani Diagouraga	1	0	1	0	2	0	0	0	4	0	0	0
22	DF	(England) Junior Osborne	1	0	0	0	0+1	0	0	0	1+1	0	1	0
23	DF	(England) Adrian Mariappa	1+2	0	0	0	1+1	0	0	0	2+3	0	0	0
25	MF	(England) Matthew Spring	36+3	8	0	0	2	0	3	1	41+3	9	8	0
26	GK	(England) Ben Foster	44	0	1	0	0	0	3	0	48	0	3	1
27	FW	(England) Joel Grant	2+5	0	0	0	1+2	0	0	0	3+7	0	1	0
28	FW	(Jamaica) Francino Francis	0+1	0	0	0	1+1	0	0	0	1+2	0	0	0
29	FW	(England) Darius Henderson	27+3	14	1	0	1	0	2+1	1	31+4	15	6	1
31	MF	(England) Alex Campana	0	0	0	0	0+1	0	0	0	0+1	0	0	0
33	FW	(Jamaica) Trevor Benjamin	2	0	0	0	0	0	0	0	2	0	0	0
34	MF	(England) Ben Gill	0	0	0+1	0	0+2	0	0	0	0+3	0	0	0
36	FW	(England) Gabriel Agbonlahor	1+1	0	0	0	0	0	0	0	1+1	0	0	0
37	FW	(England) Theo Robinson	0+1	0	0	0	0	0	0	0	0+1	0	0	0
