= Gabriel Agbonlahor =

English footballer (born 1986)

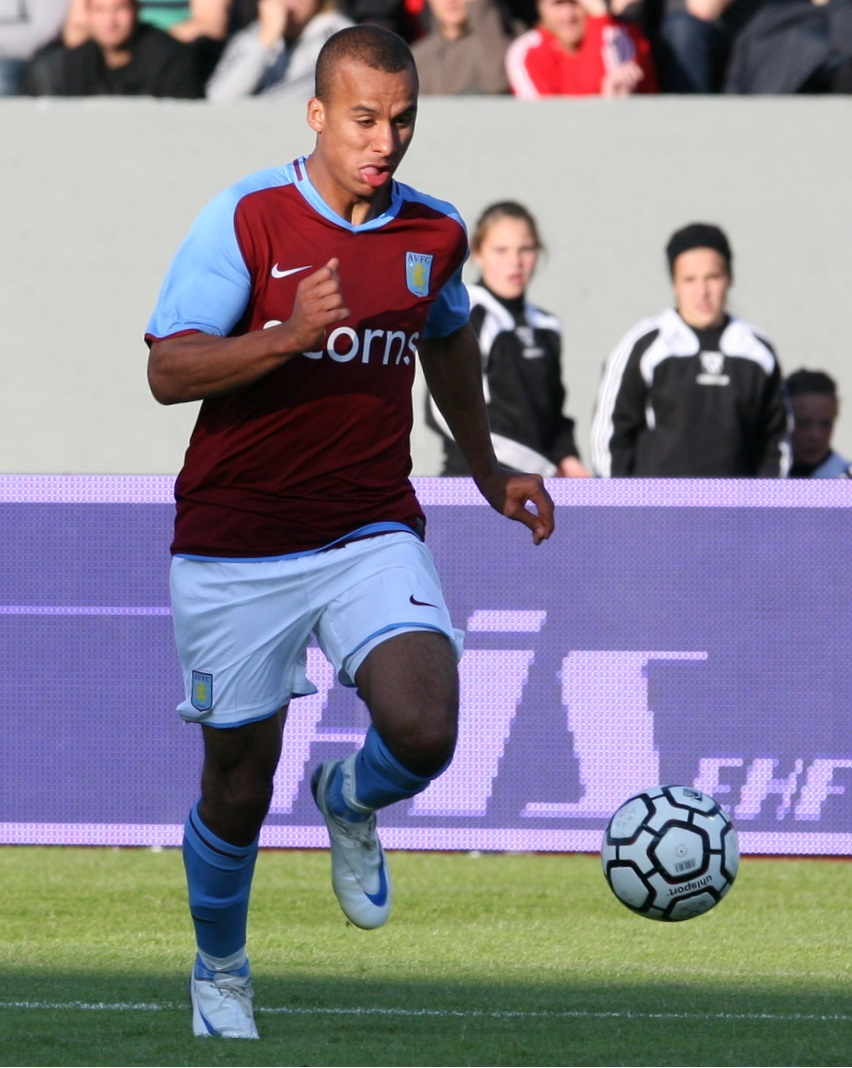
- Agbonlahor playing for Aston Villa in 2008

Personal information
- Full name: Gabriel Imuetinyan Agbonlahor
- Date of birth: 13 October 1986 (age 40)
- Place of birth: Birmingham, England
- Height: 5 ft 11 in (1.80 m)
- Position: Forward

Youth career
- Great Barr Falcons
- 1994–2005: Aston Villa

Senior career*
Years	Team	Apps	(Gls)
2005–2018	Aston Villa	341	(76)
2005	→ Watford (loan)	2	(0)
2005	→ Sheffield Wednesday (loan)	8	(0)
Total		351	(76)

International career
2006–2009	England U21	16	(4)
2008–2009	England	3	(0)
- * Club domestic league appearances and goals

Gabriel Imuetinyan Agbonlahor (born 13 October 1986) is an English former professional footballer who played as a forward; he mostly played as a striker, but he was also capable of playing on the wing. He spent his entire professional career with Aston Villa, with loan spells at Watford and Sheffield Wednesday in his late teens.

He is a product of Aston Villa's Academy, and made his first-team debut in 2006 following loans to Football League clubs Watford and Sheffield Wednesday. He made 391 total appearances for Aston Villa, including 322 in the Premier League. He scored 87 goals for the club, and was their leading Premier League goalscorer, with 74 across 11 consecutive league seasons, until Ollie Watkins broke his record in May 2025. Formerly a regular with the England under-21s, Agbonlahor made his senior international debut for England in 2008 and earned three caps.

== Club career ==
=== Early career ===
Before being scouted by Aston Villa, Agbonlahor was playing for Great Barr Falcons and his district. It was at a district game where he was scouted by Aston Villa. During this time he had also been scouted by Wolverhampton Wanderers and played a few games for them, but chose to join his boyhood football team Aston Villa in 1994. Agbonlahor came through the youth ranks at local club Aston Villa. He signed a two-year professional contract at the club in June 2005. On 22 September 2005, he was loaned to Championship club Watford, where he made his senior debut six days later, replacing Trevor Benjamin at half time in a 3–1 defeat away to Coventry City. He made his first start in his only other match for Watford, a goalless draw against Leeds United at Vicarage Road on 1 October, in which he made way for Francino Francis after 65 minutes. Agbonlahor was loaned to another team from the division on 28 October, Sheffield Wednesday, where he made eight appearances without scoring.

Agbonlahor's Premier League debut for Villa came on 18 March 2006 at the age of 19, under manager David O'Leary, against Everton at Goodison Park. O'Leary was forced to delve into the youth academy because of a lack of senior strikers due to injury, thus earning Agbonlahor a rare start. He scored after 63 minutes, although Villa went on to lose the match 4–1.

=== 2006–2008 ===
In five pre-season matches of the 2006–07 season, Agbonlahor netted three goals for Aston Villa; a quick double salvo against Walsall (the first a near-post header, the latter a close range finish) in a 5–0 victory, and a consolation strike in a 2–1 defeat at NEC. Agbonlahor started the season on the right wing in Martin O'Neill's new-look Villa team, and would be part of the team that managed to get a point from the first Premier League match at Arsenal's new Emirates Stadium. Agbonlahor's first goal of the season came at home against Charlton Athletic in a 2–0 win. On 30 September, Agbonlahor scored a crucial equaliser against Premiership champions Chelsea just before half-time, heading in Liam Ridgewell's cross with a glancing header to earn Villa a 1–1 draw.

Agbonlahor also provided cup heroics in 2006, scoring an injury-time winner to beat Leicester City 3–2 at the Walkers Stadium. The following match, he scored a consolation effort in Villa's first loss of the season, on 28 October, ten matches in. Agbonlahor completed his run of scoring against the so-called "Big Four", when he scored against Manchester United. Aston Villa were beaten 3–1 in the match at Old Trafford. Agbonlahor then scored deep into injury time in the following match, against Watford on 20 January 2007, to end a Villa winless run that stretched back to 11 November.

Agbonlahor had played every minute of Aston Villa's campaign in 2006–07, until he was replaced by Patrik Berger in the 2–0 away fixture against Reading on 10 February 2007. The following match was the first of the season that Agbonlahor did not start—he instead appeared from the bench, replacing new Villa signing Shaun Maloney. Manager Martin O'Neill suggested that Agbonlahor, who had been playing out of position on the right wing for much of the season, had done superbly. Following this break, Agbonlahor scored from the right-wing against Everton on 2 April to gain Villa a valuable point. Following this match, Agbonlahor signed a new-four-year contract at Villa. The following Saturday, in the absence of John Carew, he was moved back to his natural position at centre forward and again found his name on the scoresheet. Agbonlahor made it three in a row on Easter Monday, again scoring an equaliser, adjudged to have crossed the line by assistant referee Dave Richardson.

Agbonlahor also scored the vital second goal in the match between Aston Villa and Chelsea on 2 September, in which Villa won 2–0. Agbonlahor headed the winning goal in the 86th minute of the Second City derby away to Birmingham on 11 November, shortly after saving the ball on the line from a Liam Ridgewell shot. Agbonlahor won the Premier League Player of the Month award for November and manager Martin O'Neill won the equivalent award for the same month. On 12 April 2008, Agbonlahor scored the fourth goal against Derby County in a 6–0 victory at Pride Park Stadium in the Premier League. In the Second City derby against Birmingham City on 20 April 2008, he scored the fifth and final goal in the 5–1 victory.

=== 2008–2010 ===
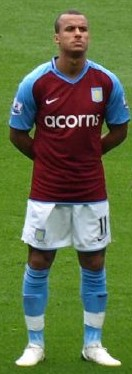
Agbonlahor lining up for Aston Villa in 2008

On 15 August 2008, Agbonlahor signed a new four-year contract with Villa, tying him to the club until 2012. Following his contract extension, on 17 August 2008, Agbonlahor scored a "perfect" hat-trick (scoring goals with his head, right foot and left foot) against Manchester City in Villa's opening match of the 2008–09 Premier League season at Villa Park. The three goals were netted in the space of seven minutes, making it the third-fastest hat-trick in the history of the Premier League after Robbie Fowler and Sadio Mané. He was later named man of the match for this performance, which led to a 4–2 victory.

Early in the season, he began to form a successful strike partnership with teammate John Carew, this demonstrated in the Premier League away matches against West Bromwich Albion and Wigan Athletic where both players scored in both matches and provided assists. On 3 November 2008, Agbonlahor was at the centre of a controversy with Newcastle United's Joey Barton when, during the match, Barton appeared to brush his fingers on Agbonlahor's face. It later emerged that Barton's attack might have been race-orientated but, after careful consideration by both Aston Villa and The Football Association, no further action was taken. On 8 November, it emerged in some national newspapers that the reason Agbonlahor decided not to pursue legal action against Barton was because he "felt sorry" for him. On 15 November, he scored once and played a part in the other goal, when Aston Villa beat Arsenal 2–0 at Emirates Stadium. He scored a brace against Bolton Wanderers on 13 December. Agbonlahor notched his tenth league goal of the season in the 90th minute in a 2–0 win against Blackburn Rovers on 7 February.

However, this was a high point in a dismal run of form in which he scored just one goal in 12 league matches. Some fans began to get frustrated with Agbonlahor, and in Villa's home defeat against Tottenham Hotspur, there were some sarcastic cheers as he was substituted off by Martin O'Neill. He was subsequently dropped to the bench for Villa's next match away to Liverpool, which Villa lost 5–0. After the heavy defeat to Liverpool and despite his lack of form, Agbonlahor was recalled to the starting 11 and went on to score a goal against Manchester United on 5 April in a 3–2 defeat for Villa. Agbonlahor was nominated for the PFA Young Player of the Year, with teammate Ashley Young ultimately winning the honour.

Agbonlahor's first goal of the 2009–10 season came in a 2–0 home victory over Fulham on 30 August 2009, scoring from 25 yards. The striker scored the only goal in the season's opening Second City derby against Birmingham City, netting an open header past Joe Hart as a result of a free kick taken by Ashley Young. Agbonlahor scored his third goal of the season scoring in a 2–0 win against Portsmouth. He scored his fourth and fifth consecutive goals of the season against Cardiff City in the League Cup and Blackburn in the Premier League. His next goal came on 24 October 2009 against Wolverhampton Wanderers at Molineux in the Premier League. Fellow Villa forward Emile Heskey played the ball into the penalty area where Agbonlahor turned a defender and placed a low shot past Wolves goalkeeper Wayne Hennessey. The match finished 1–1.

He scored the only goal in the 1–0 win against Manchester United at Old Trafford, heading in a cross from Ashley Young after 21 minutes, providing Villa's first league win at Old Trafford since 1983. Agbonlahor also scored in the second leg of the League Cup semi-final against Blackburn, helping Villa to get to the final where they lost to Manchester United, 2–1. He scored twice in 2–0 win at Fulham on 30 January 2010. On 21 February 2010, Agbonlahor provided an assist for Emile Heskey before adding Villa's final goal in a 5–2 victory over Burnley for his 11th league goal of the season. Agbonlahor finished the season with 13 goals in the Premier League, and 16 in all competitions.

=== 2010–2014 ===
Despite Villa suffering some issues on and off the field at the beginning of the season, such as the resignation of manager Martin O'Neill and a humiliating 6–0 defeat at the hands of Newcastle United, Agbonlahor defended the club and stated his intent to remain there for the long term. Agbonlahor signed a new four-and-a-half-year contract on 12 November 2010, keeping him at Villa Park until at least 2015. On 16 January 2011, he made his 200th appearance in an Aston Villa shirt in a 1–1 draw with rivals Birmingham, playing the full 90 minutes at St Andrew's. Agbonlahor scored his first goal in the Premier League since April 2010 in the 2–1 victory over Wigan Athletic on 26 January 2011 at the DW Stadium. On 16 April 2011, he scored an injury-time winner away at West Ham United. Agbonlahor was less prolific in terms of goalscoring during 2010–11 due to Aston Villa manager Gérard Houllier preferring to use him as a winger.

Agbonlahor scored his first goal of the 2011–12 season in Aston Villa's 3–1 home win over Blackburn Rovers on 20 August 2011, and followed this up with the leveller in a 2–2 away draw against Everton ten days later. For his positive performances during the opening month of the season, Agbonlahor was named as Aston Villa's Player of the Month for August 2011, beating off competition from Fabian Delph to the top spot. He then made it three goals in three matches when he scored in a 1–1 home draw against Newcastle on 17 September. This meant that Agbonlahor had equalled his Premier League goals tally from the 2010–11 season after just five matches into the new season.

After rediscovering his goalscoring form under new boss Alex McLeish, the striker publicly spoke of his discontent at the managerial tenure of Gérard Houllier and his assistant Gary McAllister and said that he even considered quitting the club had the previous regime remained. Meanwhile, on the pitch Agbonlahor continued to impress, scoring the first goal and setting up Darren Bent for the second in a man of the match performance against Wigan on 1 October. He then put in another man of the match performance against Norwich City in a 3–2 win on 5 November, setting up both of Darren Bent's goals and scoring the second himself. On 7 January 2012, he scored the second goal in a 3–1 win against Bristol Rovers in the third round of the FA Cup after Marc Albrighton had given Villa the lead. On 3 April 2012, after Aston Villa captain Stiliyan Petrov's diagnosis with acute leukaemia, Agbonlahor was named team captain upon Petrov's diagnosis.

Following the sacking of Alex McLeish in the summer of 2012, Agbonlahor was not chosen as interim captain by McLeish's successor, Paul Lambert.The Scotsman opted firstly for Darren Bent as skipper, before ultimately choosing new signing Ron Vlaar to wear the captain's armband in the absence of Stiliyan Petrov. Agbonlahor began the season injured, and could not make an appearance until the 1–1 away draw with Newcastle United on 2 September 2012. He later returned to full fitness and started the away match at Manchester City on 25 September. Agbonlahor managed to score two goals in the match as Villa secured a memorable 4–2 League Cup win (after extra time) over the Premier League champions at the City of Manchester Stadium. On 3 November 2012, he scored his first Premier League goal in just under a year against Sunderland in a run stretching 29 matches. On 6 April 2013, Agbonlahor scored his 60th Premier League goal for Aston Villa, making him joint top Premier League goalscorer for the club alongside Dwight Yorke. On 29 April, in a 6–1 win over Sunderland, Agbonlahor scored his 61st Premier League goal to overtake Yorke as Villa's top Premier League goal scorer. He scored two goals in a 2–1 win over Norwich on 4 May, moving Aston Villa up to 13th place in the Premier League.

Agbonlahor began the season brightly, winning two penalties in a 3–1 away win over Arsenal on 17 August 2013 and assisting Christian Benteke's goal against Chelsea four days later in a controversial 2–1 defeat at Stamford Bridge. This resulted in strong praise from manager Paul Lambert, and a huge demand from the public for an England call up, which was ignored by Roy Hodgson. In September, Agbonlahor participated in a charity match organised by Stiliyan Petrov, which featured many celebrities and footballers, both former and current. During the match, Agbonlahor tackled and injured One Direction member Louis Tomlinson, who then became ill after being substituted. Despite apologising to Tomlinson, Agbonlahor received many threats after the match from One Direction fans via Twitter.

=== Later career ===
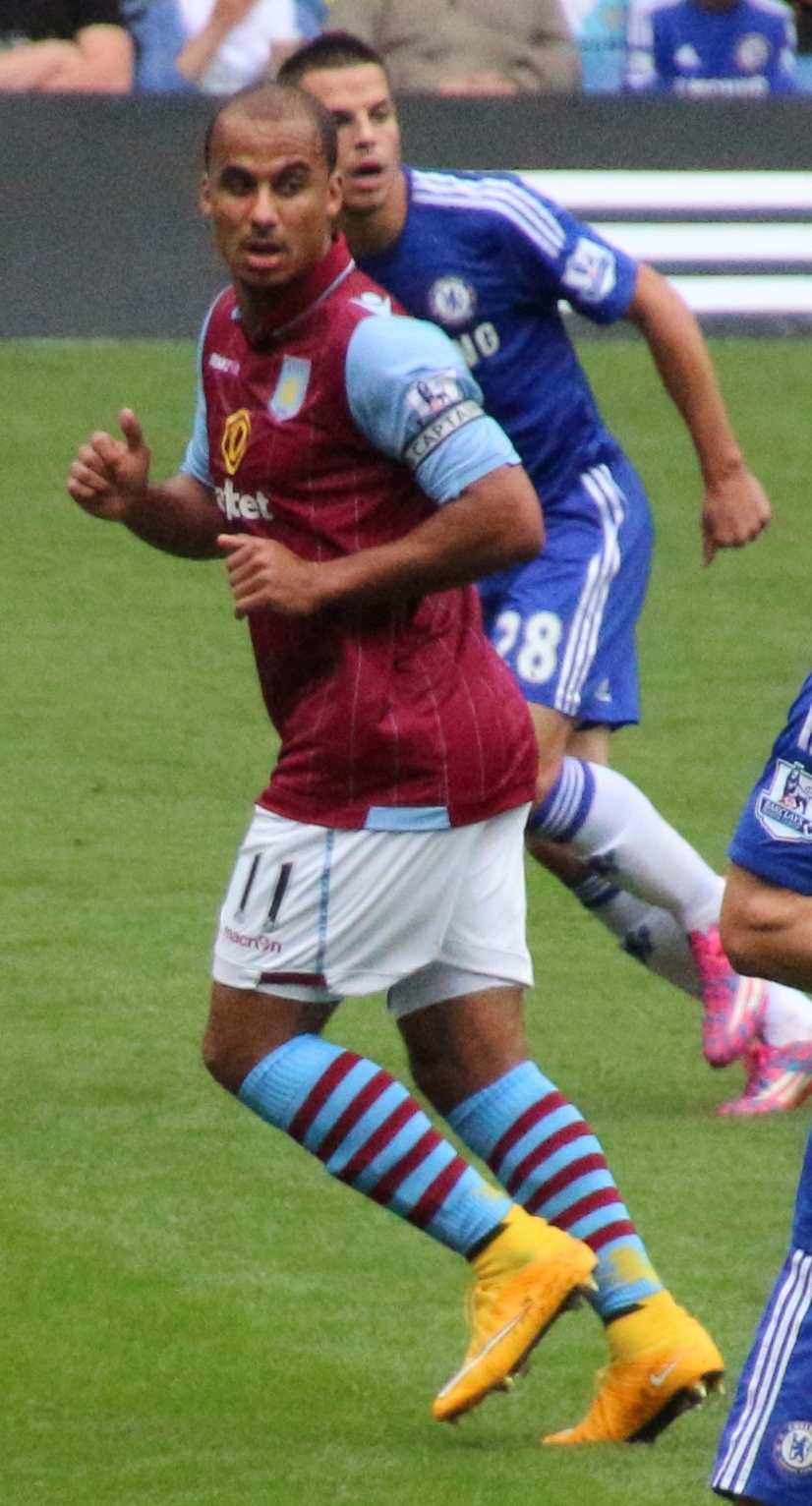
Agbonlahor playing for Aston Villa in 2014

On 10 September 2014, Agbonlahor signed a new four-year contract, saying, "I can still remember making my debut, so to still be able to contribute is a great feeling." Three days later, he scored the only goal as Villa won away at Liverpool, a club he had only scored once against before in the Premier League. Agbonlahor was given a straight red card on 20 December for a challenge on former teammate Ashley Young as Villa drew 1–1 with Manchester United, however his three-match suspension was rescinded on appeal three days later.

Agbonlahor made his 300th Premier League appearance for Villa on 14 March 2015 away to Sunderland, scoring twice in the first half in a 4–0 win. On 30 May in the FA Cup Final against Arsenal at Wembley Stadium, manager Tim Sherwood chose to start Charles N'Zogbia instead of Agbonlahor, and then brought him on in place of the Frenchman after 53 minutes, with Villa already 2–0 down; they eventually lost 4–0.

Agbonlahor was named club captain at the start of the 2015–16 season, with new signing Micah Richards named team captain. Soon after manager Rémi Garde joined, Agbonlahor was dropped from the starting line-up. During the January transfer window, there was speculation surrounding Agbonlahor and his future at the club; however, though Turkish club Kayserispor were linked, Garde later revealed that no offers had been made for him. Agbonlahor returned to the squad in an FA Cup tie against Manchester City on 30 January 2016, and scored his first goal of the season a week later in a Premier League match in a 2–0 home victory against Norwich. This was his first goal in 11 months.

On 1 April 2016, Aston Villa suspended Agbonlahor, pending an investigation into reports that he was pictured appearing to hold a shisha pipe while on holiday in Dubai. On 19 April 2016, he was again suspended after he was allegedly pictured with laughing gas canisters. He was punished with a substantial fine and resigned the captaincy. Agbonlahor failed to impress new manager Roberto Di Matteo in pre-season, and his lack of involvement led to media speculation of a move away from the club. Despite interest from Reading, he turned them down and a move failed to materialise.

When manager Steve Bruce arrived, he immediately reinstated Agbonlahor into first-team training, saying that he's "not interested in what has happened in the past" and that it's a "clean slate" for him. Bruce subsequently put him on a six-week fitness regime in a bid to get him fit for the rest of the season. Agbonlahor came on as a substitute in the Second City derby on 23 April 2017 and scored his only goal of the season in a 1–0 win.

Agbonlahor made six appearances for Villa during 2017–18 and scored a single goal, during the first game of the season against Hull City. His final game for the club came against Sheffield United on 23 December 2017. He left the club at the end of the season after his contract was not renewed, ending a 17-year association with his hometown club. During his career at Villa, he scored 86 times in 391 appearances and was the club's record Premier League scorer with 74 goals until 2025. He retired from playing on 27 March 2019 at the age of 32.

== International career ==
=== Youth ===
Agbonlahor's ancestry qualified him to play for Scotland or Nigeria at international level, but he chose to play for his homeland of England.

On 20 September 2006, Agbonlahor was pencilled in as a player in the Nigeria under-20 team for the match against Rwanda. He turned down the call, whilst not ruling out playing for the country in the future, but subsequently pledged his future to England.

On 28 September 2006, Agbonlahor received his first call-up to the England under-21 team, and won his first cap as a substitute for Wayne Routledge against Germany on 6 October. Four days later he started in place of Routledge against the same opponents. Agbonlahor was then omitted from the England's 2007 UEFA European Under-21 Championship squad, by manager Stuart Pearce, as a result of missing the England U21 training camp in Spain.

Agbonlahor was later recalled to the team by Pearce, in September 2007, netting his first goal for the under-21s, the second of a 3–0 victory over Montenegro.

=== Senior ===
On 7 March 2007, Agbonlahor was one of several surprise names called up as part of a 37-man provisional Nigeria squad by new manager Berti Vogts, alongside fellow English players Victor Anichebe and Carl Ikeme, and full Israel international Toto Tamuz.

On 1 February 2008, Agbonlahor was named in Fabio Capello's 23-man England squad to play Switzerland later in the month, although a hamstring injury forced him to withdraw from the match. Agbonlahor was also an unused substitute in England's respective 2–0 and 3–0 friendly victories against the United States and Trinidad & Tobago in May–June 2008.

On 15 November 2008, he was called up to Capello's squad for the upcoming match away to Germany, joining three other Aston Villa players in the squad: Ashley Young, Curtis Davies and Gareth Barry. On 19 November 2008, he was named to start against Germany. He played for 76 minutes, had a goal disallowed and received high praise from John Terry, the latter describing him as "a nightmare to play against".

On 11 February 2009, he was in the starting line up against Spain, where he played for 75 minutes before being substituted for debutant Carlton Cole. He made his first appearance in a competitive international on 14 October 2009, playing 66 minutes in the 3–0 win over Belarus in the last match of qualification for the 2010 World Cup. He was last called up to the squad in November 2011.

== Personal life ==
Agbonlahor was born in Birmingham, West Midlands. His parents separated while he was still young and he was brought up by his father. He went without contact with his mother for about 20 years. In 2009, ahead of the striker's 23rd birthday, his mother made a public appeal to him via the city's Sunday Mercury newspaper in order to become part of his life once more. Agbonlahor later contacted his mother and the pair then reconciled. Following retirement, he has worked as a pundit for both Sky Sports and Talksport, and written columns for online magazines such as Football Insider. Agbonlahor has four children.

== Career statistics ==
=== Club ===
Appearances and goals by club, season and competition
Club	Season	League			FA Cup		League Cup		Europe		Total	
Club	Season	Division	Apps	Goals	Apps	Goals	Apps	Goals	Apps	Goals	Apps	Goals
Aston Villa	2005–06	Premier League	9	1	0	0	0	0	—		9	1
Aston Villa	2006–07	Premier League	38	9	1	0	3	1	—		42	10
Aston Villa	2007–08	Premier League	37	11	1	0	2	0	—		40	11
Aston Villa	2008–09	Premier League	36	12	2	0	1	0	9 (Note: Appearances in UEFA Cup)	1	48	13
Aston Villa	2009–10	Premier League	36	13	2	1	6	2	2 (Note: Appearance(s) in UEFA Europa League)	0	46	16
Aston Villa	2010–11	Premier League	26	3	3	0	2	1	1	1	32	5
Aston Villa	2011–12	Premier League	33	5	2	1	1	0	—		36	6
Aston Villa	2012–13	Premier League	28	9	1	0	4	3	—		33	12
Aston Villa	2013–14	Premier League	30	4	0	0	1	0	—		31	4
Aston Villa	2014–15	Premier League	34	6	2	0	0	0	—		36	6
Aston Villa	2015–16	Premier League	15	1	1	0	2	0	—		18	1
Aston Villa	2016–17	Championship	13	1	1	0	0	0	—		14	1
Aston Villa	2017–18	Championship	6	1	0	0	0	0	—		6	1
Aston Villa	Total		341	76	16	2	22	7	12	2	391	87
Watford (loan)	2005–06	Championship	2	0	—		—		—		2	0
Sheffield Wednesday (loan)	2005–06	Championship	8	0	—		—		—		8	0
Career total			351	76	16	2	22	7	12	2	401	87

=== International ===
Appearances and goals by national team and year
National team	Year	Apps	Goals
England	2008	1	0
England	2009	2	0
Total		3	0

== Honours ==
Aston Villa

- FA Cup runner-up: 2014–15
- Football League Cup runner-up: 2009–10

England U21

- UEFA European Under-21 Championship runner-up: 2009

Individual

- Premier League Player of the Month: November 2007
