= 2008–09 Premier League =

Football season in England

Premier League
- Season: 2008–09
- Dates: 16 August 2008 – 24 May 2009
- Champions: Manchester United; 11th Premier League title 18th English title
- Relegated: Newcastle United; Middlesbrough; West Bromwich Albion
- Champions League: Manchester United; Liverpool; Chelsea; Arsenal
- Europa League: Everton; Aston Villa; Fulham
- Matches: 380
- Goals: 942 (2.48 per match)
- Top goalscorer: Nicolas Anelka (19 goals)
- Best goalkeeper: Edwin van der Sar (21 clean sheets)
- Biggest home win: Manchester City 6–0 Portsmouth (21 September 2008)
- Biggest away win: Hull City 0–5 Wigan Athletic (30 August 2008); Middlesbrough 0–5 Chelsea (18 October 2008); West Bromwich Albion 0–5; Manchester United (27 January 2009)
- Highest scoring: Arsenal 4–4 Tottenham Hotspur (29 October 2008); Liverpool 4–4 Arsenal (21 April 2009)
- Longest winning run: 11 games Manchester United
- Longest unbeaten run: 21 games Arsenal
- Longest winless run: 14 games Middlesbrough
- Longest losing run: 6 games Blackburn Rovers; Hull City
- Highest attendance: 75,569; Manchester United 1–4 Liverpool (14 March 2009)
- Lowest attendance: 14,169; Wigan Athletic 0–1 West Ham United (4 March 2009)
- Total attendance: 13,524,978
- Average attendance: 35,592

The 2008–09 Premier League (known as the Barclays Premier League for sponsorship reasons) was the 17th season since the establishment of the Premier League in 1992. The season began on Saturday, 16 August 2008, and ended on 24 May 2009. The fixtures were announced on 16 June 2008. A total of 20 teams contested the league, consisting of 17 who competed in the previous season and three promoted from the Football League Championship. The new match ball was the Nike T90 Omni.

Manchester United began the season as the two-time defending champions, having secured their second consecutive (and tenth) Premier League title on the final day of the previous season.

== Season summary ==
At the start of the season, clubs were allowed to name seven substitutes on the bench instead of five. This season was also different in that there was no New Year's Day game, as is traditional. This was because the FA Cup third round is traditionally played on the first Saturday in January, which in 2009 fell in the usual spot for New Year's league games. September saw Manchester City taken over by the Abu Dhabi United Group, transforming the football club into one of the world's wealthiest, securing the signing of Robinho for a British record £32.5 million just seconds before the 2008 summer transfer window closed in the process.

The first goal of the season was scored by Arsenal's Samir Nasri against newly promoted West Bromwich Albion in the fourth minute of the early kick-off game on the opening day of the season on 16 August. Gabriel Agbonlahor of Aston Villa scored the first hat-trick of the season against Manchester City, scoring three goals in the space of seven minutes.

The title race was a battle between Manchester United and bitter rivals Liverpool, who beat them 4–1 at Old Trafford on 14 March 2009. Liverpool topped the table at the end of 2008, but their lead slipped after a series of draws. On 16 May 2009, Manchester United clinched the Premier League title after a goalless draw against Arsenal. It was their 11th Premier League title and 18th English top flight title overall, tying a record with Liverpool, who finished as runners-up. It was the second time that they had won the title for three consecutive years, the first being in 2001. Only four other clubs have achieved this feat: Huddersfield Town (1923–25), Arsenal (1933–35), Liverpool (1982–84) and Manchester City (2021–24), with the latter becoming the first club to win the English top flight title for four consecutive seasons.

West Bromwich Albion were the first team to be relegated to the Championship after losing 2–0 at home to Liverpool on 17 May 2009. Middlesbrough and Newcastle United joined them on the last day of the season after losses at West Ham United and Aston Villa, respectively. The results meant that Hull City and Sunderland stayed up, despite home defeats to Manchester United and Chelsea respectively. The fact that Hull City avoided relegation (along with Stoke City, who stayed up relatively comfortably under the management of Tony Pulis), meant it was the first time since the 2005–06 season that more than one promoted club maintained their Premier League status. Aston Villa, Everton and Fulham, who stayed up last season on goal difference, all secured European football for the 2009–10 season through their league positions.

== Teams ==
Twenty teams competed in the league – the top seventeen teams from the previous season and the three teams promoted from the Championship. The promoted teams were West Bromwich Albion, Stoke City (returning to the top flight after absences of two and twenty-three years respectively) and Hull City (playing top flight football for the first time ever). This was also Stoke City's first season in the Premier League. They replaced Reading (relegated to the Championship after a two-year top-flight spell), Birmingham City and Derby County (both teams relegated to the Championship after a season's presence).

=== Stadiums and locations ===
Locations of the 2008–09 Premier League teams
Greater London Premier League football clubs
Greater Manchester Premier League football clubs

| Team | Location | Stadium | Capacity |
|---|---|---|---|
| Arsenal | London (Holloway) | Emirates Stadium | 60,432 |
| Aston Villa | Birmingham | Villa Park | 42,640 |
| Blackburn Rovers | Blackburn | Ewood Park | 31,367 |
| Bolton Wanderers | Bolton | Reebok Stadium | 28,723 |
| Chelsea | London (Fulham) | Stamford Bridge | 42,055 |
| Everton | Liverpool (Walton) | Goodison Park | 40,157 |
| Fulham | London (Fulham) | Craven Cottage | 26,500 |
| Hull City | Kingston upon Hull | KC Stadium | 25,404 |
| Liverpool | Liverpool (Anfield) | Anfield | 45,276 |
| Manchester City | Manchester (Bradford) | City of Manchester Stadium | 47,726 |
| Manchester United | Manchester (Old Trafford) | Old Trafford | 76,212 |
| Middlesbrough | Middlesbrough | Riverside Stadium | 35,100 |
| Newcastle United | Newcastle upon Tyne | St James' Park | 52,387 |
| Portsmouth | Portsmouth | Fratton Park | 20,224 |
| Stoke City | Stoke-on-Trent | Britannia Stadium | 28,000 |
| Sunderland | Sunderland | Stadium of Light | 49,000 |
| Tottenham Hotspur | London (Tottenham) | White Hart Lane | 36,240 |
| West Bromwich Albion | West Bromwich | The Hawthorns | 25,369 |
| West Ham United | London (Upton Park) | Upton Park | 35,303 |
| Wigan Athletic | Wigan | JJB Stadium | 25,138 |

=== Personnel and kits ===
(as of 24 May 2009)

| Team | Manager | Captain | Kit manufacturer | Shirt sponsor |
|---|---|---|---|---|
| Arsenal | (France) Arsène Wenger | (Spain) Cesc Fàbregas | Nike | Fly Emirates |
| Aston Villa | (Northern Ireland) Martin O'Neill | (Denmark) Martin Laursen | Nike | Acorns |
| Blackburn Rovers | (England) Sam Allardyce | (New Zealand) Ryan Nelsen | Umbro | Crown Paints |
| Bolton Wanderers | (England) Gary Megson | (England) Kevin Davies | Reebok | Reebok |
| Chelsea | (Netherlands) Guus Hiddink | (England) John Terry | Adidas | Samsung |
| Everton | (Scotland) David Moyes | (England) Phil Neville | Umbro | Chang |
| Fulham | (England) Roy Hodgson | (England) Danny Murphy | Nike | LG |
| Hull City | (England) Phil Brown | (England) Ian Ashbee | Umbro | Karoo (H) / Kingston Communications (A, 3rd) |
| Liverpool | (Spain) Rafael Benítez | (England) Steven Gerrard | Adidas | Carlsberg |
| Manchester City | (Wales) Mark Hughes | (Republic of Ireland) Richard Dunne | Le Coq Sportif | Thomas Cook |
| Manchester United | (Scotland) Sir Alex Ferguson | (England) Gary Neville | Nike | AIG |
| Middlesbrough | (England) Gareth Southgate | (Austria) Emmanuel Pogatetz | Erreà | Garmin |
| Newcastle United | (England) Alan Shearer | (England) Nicky Butt | Adidas | Northern Rock |
| Portsmouth | (England) Paul Hart | (England) David James | Canterbury | Oki |
| Stoke City | (Wales) Tony Pulis | (England) Andy Griffin | Le Coq Sportif | Britannia |
| Sunderland | (Scotland) Ricky Sbragia | (England) Dean Whitehead | Umbro | Boylesports |
| Tottenham Hotspur | (England) Harry Redknapp | (England) Ledley King | Puma | Mansion.com; Casino & Poker |
| West Bromwich Albion | (England) Tony Mowbray | (England) Jonathan Greening | Umbro | None |
| West Ham United | (Italy) Gianfranco Zola | (England) Matthew Upson | Umbro | SBOBET^{1} |
| Wigan Athletic | (England) Steve Bruce | (Netherlands) Mario Melchiot | Champion | JJB Sports |

1. West Ham United's shirt sponsor was XL Holidays until 12 September 2008 after the company was placed into administration. The club ran sponsorless until 3 December 2008 when the deal with SBOBET was announced.

Also, Nike provided new match balls, white with red and yellow (autumn/spring) and yellow with purple and black (winter), based on their T90 Laser II Omni model.

=== Managerial changes ===
| Team | Outgoing manager | Manner of departure | Date of vacancy | Table | Incoming manager | Date of appointment |
|---|---|---|---|---|---|---|
| Chelsea | (Israel) Avram Grant | Sacked | 24 May 2008 | Pre-season | (Brazil) Luiz Felipe Scolari | 1 July 2008 |
| Manchester City | (Sweden) Sven-Göran Eriksson | Mutual consent | 2 June 2008 | Pre-season | (Wales) Mark Hughes | 4 June 2008 |
| Blackburn Rovers | (Wales) Mark Hughes | Signed by Manchester City | 4 June 2008 | Pre-season | (England) Paul Ince | 22 June 2008 |
| West Ham United | (England) Alan Curbishley | Resigned | 3 September 2008 | 5th | (Italy) Gianfranco Zola | 11 September 2008 |
| Newcastle United | (England) Kevin Keegan | Resigned | 4 September 2008 | 11th | (Republic of Ireland) Joe Kinnear | 26 September 2008 |
| Tottenham Hotspur | (Spain) Juande Ramos | Sacked | 25 October 2008 | 20th | (England) Harry Redknapp | 26 October 2008 |
| Portsmouth | (England) Harry Redknapp | Signed by Tottenham | 26 October 2008 | 7th | (England) Tony Adams | 28 October 2008 |
| Sunderland | (Republic of Ireland) Roy Keane | Resigned | 4 December 2008 | 18th | (Scotland) Ricky Sbragia | 27 December 2008 |
| Blackburn Rovers | (England) Paul Ince | Sacked | 16 December 2008 | 19th | (England) Sam Allardyce | 17 December 2008 |
| Portsmouth | (England) Tony Adams | Sacked | 9 February 2009 | 16th | (England) Paul Hart | 9 February 2009 |
| Chelsea | (Brazil) Luiz Felipe Scolari | Sacked | 9 February 2009 | 4th | (Netherlands) Guus Hiddink | 11 February 2009 |
| Newcastle United | (Republic of Ireland) Joe Kinnear | Medical break clause | 16 February 2009 | 13th | (England) Alan Shearer | 31 March 2009 |

- ^1 Newcastle United manager Joe Kinnear was originally appointed as interim manager until the end of October on 26 September, signed a one-month contract extension on 24 October, and was named manager until the end of the English football season on 28 November.
- ^2 Portsmouth caretaker manager Paul Hart was appointed on 9 February. On 3 March chairman Alexandre Gaydamak confirmed the appointment would be until at least the end of the English football season.
- ^3 Chelsea manager Guus Hiddink remained Russia manager until the end of the English football season, when he left Chelsea and returned to his Russia duties on a full-time basis.
- ^4 Newcastle United manager Joe Kinnear took leave from Newcastle United following heart bypass surgery on 16 February. His assistants, Chris Hughton and Colin Calderwood, were appointed to serve as caretaker managers until his return, which was understood might not occur before the end of the English football season. On 31 March, Alan Shearer was appointed manager until the end of the season, as Joe Kinnear was not able to return to his Newcastle United duties until the end of the English football season. After the season ended, both Joe Kinnear and Alan Shearer left the club permanently, and Chris Hughton was appointed manager during the course of the following season.
- ^5 Roberto Martínez was announced to be manager on 9 June, however due to complications surrounding the appointment of backroom staff, the deal was not finalised and officially announced until 15 June.

== League table ==
| Pos | Team | Pld | W | D | L | GF | GA | GD | Pts | Qualification or relegation |
|---|---|---|---|---|---|---|---|---|---|---|
| 1 | Manchester United (C) | 38 | 28 | 6 | 4 | 68 | 24 | +44 | 90 | Qualification for the Champions League group stage (Note: Since both finalists of the FA Cup (Chelsea and Everton) and the League Cup winners (Manchester United) qualified for the European competitions based on their league position, the sixth-placed team (Aston Villa) received a berth in the Europa League play-off round and the seventh-placed team (Fulham) received a berth in the Europa League third qualifying round.) |
| 2 | Liverpool | 38 | 25 | 11 | 2 | 77 | 27 | +50 | 86 | Qualification for the Champions League group stage |
| 3 | Chelsea | 38 | 25 | 8 | 5 | 68 | 24 | +44 | 83 | Qualification for the Champions League group stage |
| 4 | Arsenal | 38 | 20 | 12 | 6 | 68 | 37 | +31 | 72 | Qualification for the Champions League play-off round |
| 5 | Everton | 38 | 17 | 12 | 9 | 55 | 37 | +18 | 63 | Qualification for the Europa League play-off round |
| 6 | Aston Villa | 38 | 17 | 11 | 10 | 54 | 48 | +6 | 62 | Qualification for the Europa League play-off round |
| 7 | Fulham | 38 | 14 | 11 | 13 | 39 | 34 | +5 | 53 | Qualification for the Europa League third qualifying round |
| 8 | Tottenham Hotspur | 38 | 14 | 9 | 15 | 45 | 45 | 0 | 51 | |
| 9 | West Ham United | 38 | 14 | 9 | 15 | 42 | 45 | −3 | 51 | |
| 10 | Manchester City | 38 | 15 | 5 | 18 | 58 | 50 | +8 | 50 | |
| 11 | Wigan Athletic | 38 | 12 | 9 | 17 | 34 | 45 | −11 | 45 | |
| 12 | Stoke City | 38 | 12 | 9 | 17 | 38 | 55 | −17 | 45 | |
| 13 | Bolton Wanderers | 38 | 11 | 8 | 19 | 41 | 53 | −12 | 41 | |
| 14 | Portsmouth | 38 | 10 | 11 | 17 | 38 | 57 | −19 | 41 | |
| 15 | Blackburn Rovers | 38 | 10 | 11 | 17 | 40 | 60 | −20 | 41 | |
| 16 | Sunderland | 38 | 9 | 9 | 20 | 34 | 54 | −20 | 36 | |
| 17 | Hull City | 38 | 8 | 11 | 19 | 39 | 64 | −25 | 35 | |
| 18 | Newcastle United (R) | 38 | 7 | 13 | 18 | 40 | 59 | −19 | 34 | Relegation to Football League Championship |
| 19 | Middlesbrough (R) | 38 | 7 | 11 | 20 | 28 | 57 | −29 | 32 | Relegation to Football League Championship |
| 20 | West Bromwich Albion (R) | 38 | 8 | 8 | 22 | 36 | 67 | −31 | 32 | Relegation to Football League Championship |

Source: Barclays Premier League
Rules for classification: 1) points; 2) goal difference; 3) number of goals scored.
(C) Champions; (R) Relegated

== Results ==
| Home \ Away | ARS | AVL | BLB | BOL | CHE | EVE | FUL | HUL | LIV | MCI | MUN | MID | NEW | POR | STK | SUN | TOT | WBA | WHU | WIG |
|---|---|---|---|---|---|---|---|---|---|---|---|---|---|---|---|---|---|---|---|---|
| Arsenal | | 0–2 | 4–0 | 1–0 | 1–4 | 3–1 | 0–0 | 1–2 | 1–1 | 2–0 | 2–1 | 2–0 | 3–0 | 1–0 | 4–1 | 0–0 | 4–4 | 1–0 | 0–0 | 1–0 |
| Aston Villa | 2–2 | | 3–2 | 4–2 | 0–1 | 3–3 | 0–0 | 1–0 | 0–0 | 4–2 | 0–0 | 1–2 | 1–0 | 0–0 | 2–2 | 2–1 | 1–2 | 2–1 | 1–1 | 0–0 |
| Blackburn Rovers | 0–4 | 0–2 | | 2–2 | 0–2 | 0–0 | 1–0 | 1–1 | 1–3 | 2–2 | 0–2 | 1–1 | 3–0 | 2–0 | 3–0 | 1–2 | 2–1 | 0–0 | 1–1 | 2–0 |
| Bolton Wanderers | 1–3 | 1–1 | 0–0 | | 0–2 | 0–1 | 1–3 | 1–1 | 0–2 | 2–0 | 0–1 | 4–1 | 1–0 | 2–1 | 3–1 | 0–0 | 3–2 | 0–0 | 2–1 | 0–1 |
| Chelsea | 1–2 | 2–0 | 2–0 | 4–3 | | 0–0 | 3–1 | 0–0 | 0–1 | 1–0 | 1–1 | 2–0 | 0–0 | 4–0 | 2–1 | 5–0 | 1–1 | 2–0 | 1–1 | 2–1 |
| Everton | 1–1 | 2–3 | 2–3 | 3–0 | 0–0 | | 1–0 | 2–0 | 0–2 | 1–2 | 1–1 | 1–1 | 2–2 | 0–3 | 3–1 | 3–0 | 0–0 | 2–0 | 3–1 | 4–0 |
| Fulham | 1–0 | 3–1 | 1–2 | 2–1 | 2–2 | 0–2 | | 0–1 | 0–1 | 1–1 | 2–0 | 3–0 | 2–1 | 3–1 | 1–0 | 0–0 | 2–1 | 2–0 | 1–2 | 2–0 |
| Hull City | 1–3 | 0–1 | 1–2 | 0–1 | 0–3 | 2–2 | 2–1 | | 1–3 | 2–2 | 0–1 | 2–1 | 1–1 | 0–0 | 1–2 | 1–4 | 1–2 | 2–2 | 1–0 | 0–5 |
| Liverpool | 4–4 | 5–0 | 4–0 | 3–0 | 2–0 | 1–1 | 0–0 | 2–2 | | 1–1 | 2–1 | 2–1 | 3–0 | 1–0 | 0–0 | 2–0 | 3–1 | 3–0 | 0–0 | 3–2 |
| Manchester City | 3–0 | 2–0 | 3–1 | 1–0 | 1–3 | 0–1 | 1–3 | 5–1 | 2–3 | | 0–1 | 1–0 | 2–1 | 6–0 | 3–0 | 1–0 | 1–2 | 4–2 | 3–0 | 1–0 |
| Manchester United | 0–0 | 3–2 | 2–1 | 2–0 | 3–0 | 1–0 | 3–0 | 4–3 | 1–4 | 2–0 | | 1–0 | 1–1 | 2–0 | 5–0 | 1–0 | 5–2 | 4–0 | 2–0 | 1–0 |
| Middlesbrough | 1–1 | 1–1 | 0–0 | 1–3 | 0–5 | 0–1 | 0–0 | 3–1 | 2–0 | 2–0 | 0–2 | | 0–0 | 1–1 | 2–1 | 1–1 | 2–1 | 0–1 | 1–1 | 0–0 |
| Newcastle United | 1–3 | 2–0 | 1–2 | 1–0 | 0–2 | 0–0 | 0–1 | 1–2 | 1–5 | 2–2 | 1–2 | 3–1 | | 0–0 | 2–2 | 1–1 | 2–1 | 2–1 | 2–2 | 2–2 |
| Portsmouth | 0–3 | 0–1 | 3–2 | 1–0 | 0–1 | 2–1 | 1–1 | 2–2 | 2–3 | 2–0 | 0–1 | 2–1 | 0–3 | | 2–1 | 3–1 | 2–0 | 2–2 | 1–4 | 1–2 |
| Stoke City | 2–1 | 3–2 | 1–0 | 2–0 | 0–2 | 2–3 | 0–0 | 1–1 | 0–0 | 1–0 | 0–1 | 1–0 | 1–1 | 2–2 | | 1–0 | 2–1 | 1–0 | 0–1 | 2–0 |
| Sunderland | 1–1 | 1–2 | 0–0 | 1–4 | 2–3 | 0–2 | 1–0 | 1–0 | 0–1 | 0–3 | 1–2 | 2–0 | 2–1 | 1–2 | 2–0 | | 1–1 | 4–0 | 0–1 | 1–2 |
| Tottenham Hotspur | 0–0 | 1–2 | 1–0 | 2–0 | 1–0 | 0–1 | 0–0 | 0–1 | 2–1 | 2–1 | 0–0 | 4–0 | 1–0 | 1–1 | 3–1 | 1–2 | | 1–0 | 1–0 | 0–0 |
| West Bromwich Albion | 1–3 | 1–2 | 2–2 | 1–1 | 0–3 | 1–2 | 1–0 | 0–3 | 0–2 | 2–1 | 0–5 | 3–0 | 2–3 | 1–1 | 0–2 | 3–0 | 2–0 | | 3–2 | 3–1 |
| West Ham United | 0–2 | 0–1 | 4–1 | 1–3 | 0–1 | 1–3 | 3–1 | 2–0 | 0–3 | 1–0 | 0–1 | 2–1 | 3–1 | 0–0 | 2–1 | 2–0 | 0–2 | 0–0 | | 2–1 |
| Wigan Athletic | 1–4 | 0–4 | 3–0 | 0–0 | 0–1 | 1–0 | 0–0 | 1–0 | 1–1 | 2–1 | 1–2 | 0–1 | 2–1 | 1–0 | 0–0 | 1–1 | 1–0 | 2–1 | 0–1 | |

Source: Barclays Premier League
Legend: Blue = home team win; Yellow = draw; Red = away team win.

== Season statistics ==
=== Scoring ===
- First goal of the season: Samir Nasri for Arsenal against West Bromwich, 3 minutes and 40 seconds. (16 August 2008).
- Last goal of the season: Kenwyne Jones for Sunderland against Chelsea, 90 minutes. (24 May 2009)
- Fastest goal in a match: 31 seconds – Steve Sidwell for Aston Villa against Everton (7 December 2008))
- Goal scored at the latest point in a match: 90+4 minutes and 56 seconds – Carlton Cole for West Ham United against Blackburn (30 August 2008)
- First own goal of the season: Robert Huth (Middlesbrough) for Tottenham Hotspur, 90+2 minutes and 28 seconds (16 August 2008)
- First hat-trick of the season and fastest hat-trick of the season: Gabriel Agbonlahor (Aston Villa) against Manchester City, 7 minutes and 3 seconds (17 August 2008)
- Most goals scored by one player in a match: 4 goals – Andrey Arshavin (Arsenal) against Liverpool, 36', 67', 70', 90' (21 April 2009)
- Widest winning margin: 6 goals – Manchester City 6–0 Portsmouth (21 September 2008)
- Most goals in a match: 8 goals
  - Arsenal 4–4 Tottenham Hotspur (29 October 2008)
  - Liverpool 4–4 Arsenal (21 April 2009)
- Most goals in one half: 7 goals – Liverpool v Arsenal (21 April 2009) 0–1 at half time, 4–4 final
- Most goals in one half by a single team: 5 goals – Manchester United v Tottenham Hotspur (25 April 2009) 0–2 at half-time, 5–2 final

==== Top scorers ====
| Rank | Player | Club | Goals |
|---|---|---|---|
| 1 | (France) Nicolas Anelka | Chelsea | 19 |
| 2 | (Portugal) Cristiano Ronaldo | Manchester United | 18 |
| 3 | (England) Steven Gerrard | Liverpool | 16 |
| 4 | (Brazil) Robinho | Manchester City | 14 |
| 4 | (Spain) Fernando Torres | Liverpool | 14 |
| 6 | (England) Gabriel Agbonlahor | Aston Villa | 12 |
| 6 | (England) Darren Bent | Tottenham Hotspur | 12 |
| 6 | (England) Kevin Davies | Bolton Wanderers | 12 |
| 6 | (Netherlands) Dirk Kuyt | Liverpool | 12 |
| 6 | (England) Frank Lampard | Chelsea | 12 |
| 6 | (England) Wayne Rooney | Manchester United | 12 |

=== Clean sheets ===
- Most clean sheets – Manchester United (24)
- Fewest clean sheets – Hull City (6)

=== Discipline ===
- First yellow card of the season: Sam Ricketts for Hull City against Fulham, 28 minutes and 6 seconds (16 August 2008)
- First red card of the season: Mark Noble for West Ham United against Manchester City, 37 minutes and 20 seconds (24 August 2008)
- Card given at latest point in a game: Michael Dawson (red) at 90+8 minutes and 28 seconds for Tottenham Hotspur against Stoke City (19 October 2008)
- Most yellow cards in a single match: 8
  - Chelsea 1–1 Manchester United – one for Chelsea (Mikel John Obi) and seven for Manchester United (Paul Scholes, Rio Ferdinand, Gary Neville, Dimitar Berbatov, Wayne Rooney, Patrice Evra and Cristiano Ronaldo) (21 September 2008)
  - Sunderland 1–1 Arsenal – three for Sunderland (Dean Whitehead, Kieran Richardson and Dwight Yorke) and five for Arsenal (Gaël Clichy, Kolo Touré, Alex Song, Nicklas Bendtner and Emmanuel Adebayor) (4 October 2008)
  - Aston Villa 2–2 Arsenal – four for Aston Villa (Gabriel Agbonlahor, Nigel Reo-Coker, Stiliyan Petrov and Gareth Barry) and four for Arsenal (Alex Song, Kolo Touré, Abou Diaby and Robin van Persie) (26 December 2008)
  - Manchester United 3–0 Chelsea – three for Manchester United (Cristiano Ronaldo, Wayne Rooney and Park Ji-sung) and five for Chelsea (Frank Lampard, José Bosingwa, Ricardo Carvalho, John Terry and Juliano Belletti) (11 January 2009)
  - Manchester City 1–0 Sunderland – three for Manchester City (Valeri Bojinov, Gélson Fernandes and Shaun Wright-Phillips) and five for Sunderland (Phil Bardsley, Calum Davenport, Grant Leadbitter, Andy Reid and Anton Ferdinand) (22 March 2009)
- Most red cards in a single match: 3 – Manchester City 1–2 Tottenham Hotspur – two for Manchester City (Richard Dunne and Gélson Fernandes) and one for Tottenham Hotspur (Benoît Assou-Ekotto) (9 November 2008)

=== Table related statistics ===
==== Overall ====
- Most wins – Manchester United (28)
- Fewest wins – Middlesbrough and Newcastle United (7)
- Most losses – West Bromwich Albion (22)
- Fewest losses – Liverpool (2)
- Most goals scored – Liverpool (77)
- Fewest goals scored – Middlesbrough (28)
- Most goals conceded – West Bromwich Albion (67)
- Fewest goals conceded – Chelsea and Manchester United (24)

==== Home ====
- Most wins – Manchester United (16)
- Fewest wins – Hull City (3)
- Most losses – Hull City (11)
- Fewest losses – Liverpool (0)
- Most goals scored – Manchester United (43)
- Fewest goals scored – Middlesbrough and Wigan Athletic (17)
- Most goals conceded – Hull City (36)
- Fewest goals conceded – Tottenham Hotspur (10)

==== Away ====
- Most wins – Chelsea (14)
- Fewest wins – West Bromwich Albion (1)
- Most losses – Middlesbrough (15)
- Fewest losses – Liverpool (2)
- Most goals scored – Arsenal (37)
- Fewest goals scored – West Bromwich Albion (10)
- Most goals conceded – Stoke City (40)
- Fewest goals conceded – Manchester United (11)

=== Miscellaneous ===
- Longest injury time: 11 minutes, 2 seconds – Stoke City against Tottenham Hotspur (19 October 2008)

== Awards ==
=== Monthly awards ===
| Month | Manager of the Month | | Player of the Month | |
| Month | Manager | Club | Player | Club |
|---|---|---|---|---|
| August | (England) Gareth Southgate | Middlesbrough | (Portugal) Deco | Chelsea |
| September | (England) Phil Brown | Hull City | (England) Ashley Young | Aston Villa |
| October | (Spain) Rafael Benítez | Liverpool | (England) Frank Lampard | Chelsea |
| November | (England) Gary Megson | Bolton Wanderers | (France) Nicolas Anelka | Chelsea |
| December | (Northern Ireland) Martin O'Neill | Aston Villa | (England) Ashley Young | Aston Villa |
| January | (Scotland) Sir Alex Ferguson | Manchester United | (Serbia) Nemanja Vidić | Manchester United |
| February | (Scotland) David Moyes | Everton | (England) Phil Jagielka | Everton |
| March | (Spain) Rafael Benítez | Liverpool | (England) Steven Gerrard | Liverpool |
| April | (Scotland) Sir Alex Ferguson | Manchester United | (Russia) Andrey Arshavin | Arsenal |

=== Annual awards ===
| Award | Winner | Club |
|---|---|---|
| Premier League Manager of the Season | (Scotland) Sir Alex Ferguson | Manchester United |
| Premier League Player of the Season | (Serbia) Nemanja Vidić | Manchester United |
| PFA Players' Player of the Year | (Wales) Ryan Giggs | Manchester United |
| PFA Young Player of the Year | (England) Ashley Young | Aston Villa |
| FWA Footballer of the Year | (England) Steven Gerrard | Liverpool |
| LMA Manager of the Year | (Scotland) David Moyes | Everton |
| PFA Fans' Player of the Year | (England) Steven Gerrard | Liverpool |

PFA Team of the Year
(Netherlands) Edwin van der Sar (Manchester United)
| (England) Glen Johnson (Portsmouth) | (Serbia) Nemanja Vidić (Manchester United) | (England) Rio Ferdinand (Manchester United) | (France) Patrice Evra (Manchester United) |
| (England) Steven Gerrard (Liverpool) | (Portugal) Cristiano Ronaldo (Manchester United) | (Wales) Ryan Giggs (Manchester United) | (England) Ashley Young (Aston Villa) |
| (France) Nicolas Anelka (Chelsea) | | (Spain) Fernando Torres (Liverpool) | |

== Attendances ==
| No. | Club | Matches | Total attendance | Average |
|---|---|---|---|---|
| 1 | Manchester United | 19 | 1,430,776 | 75,304 |
| 2 | Arsenal FC | 19 | 1,140,755 | 60,040 |
| 3 | Newcastle United | 19 | 926,244 | 48,750 |
| 4 | Liverpool FC | 19 | 828,610 | 43,611 |
| 5 | Manchester City | 19 | 815,105 | 42,900 |
| 6 | Chelsea FC | 19 | 790,172 | 41,588 |
| 7 | Sunderland AFC | 19 | 763,198 | 40,168 |
| 8 | Aston Villa | 19 | 756,422 | 39,812 |
| 9 | Tottenham Hotspur | 19 | 682,649 | 35,929 |
| 10 | Everton FC | 19 | 677,679 | 35,667 |
| 11 | West Ham United | 19 | 640,307 | 33,700 |
| 12 | Middlesbrough FC | 19 | 540,144 | 28,429 |
| 13 | Stoke City | 19 | 509,604 | 26,821 |
| 14 | West Bromwich Albion | 19 | 490,524 | 25,817 |
| 15 | Hull City | 19 | 471,507 | 24,816 |
| 16 | Fulham FC | 19 | 462,534 | 24,344 |
| 17 | Blackburn Rovers | 19 | 446,102 | 23,479 |
| 18 | Bolton Wanderers | 19 | 427,228 | 22,486 |
| 19 | Portsmouth FC | 19 | 376,762 | 19,830 |
| 20 | Wigan Athletic | 19 | 348,656 | 18,350 |
