= Ashley Young =

English footballer (born 1985)

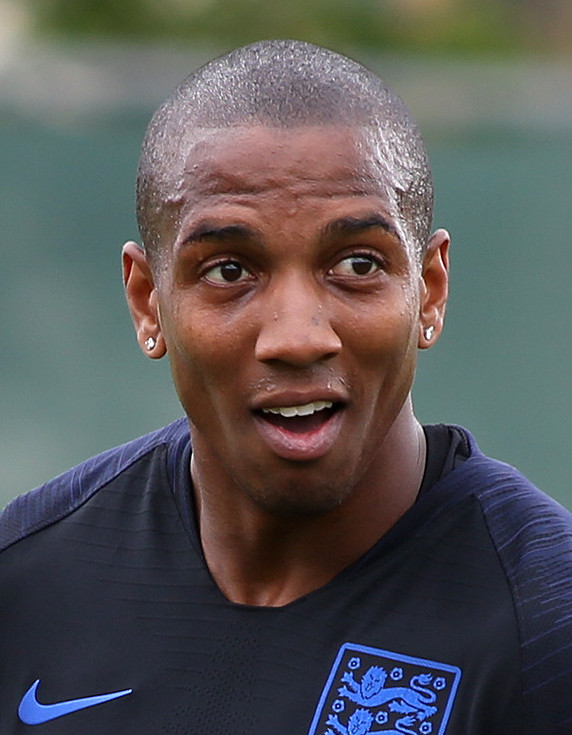
- Young with England in 2018

Personal information
- Full name: Ashley Simon Young
- Date of birth: 9 July 1985 (age 41)
- Place of birth: Stevenage, Hertfordshire, England
- Height: 5 ft 9 in (1.75 m)
- Positions: Winger; full-back

Youth career
- 1995–2003: Watford

Senior career*
Years	Team	Apps	(Gls)
2003–2007	Watford	98	(22)
2007–2011	Aston Villa	157	(30)
2011–2020	Manchester United	192	(15)
2020–2021	Inter Milan	44	(5)
2021–2023	Aston Villa	53	(1)
2023–2025	Everton	63	(1)
2025–2026	Ipswich Town	13	(0)
Total		620	(71)

International career
2006–2007	England U21	10	(0)
2007–2018	England	39	(7)
Medal record
England
UEFA European U-21 Championship
Bronze medal – third place	2007 Netherlands
- * Club domestic league appearances and goals

Ashley Simon Young (born 9 July 1985) is an English professional football pundit and former player who played as a winger and full-back.

Young started his career as a winger at Watford and made his first senior appearance in 2003 under manager Ray Lewington. He became a first team regular in the 2004–05 season and was one of Watford's key players during their road to promotion during the 2005–06 season. In January 2007, he transferred to Aston Villa for an initial fee of £8 million where he won the PFA Young Player of the Year award in 2009. In June 2011, Young signed with Manchester United for a fee of around £17 million. He won five trophies at United, including the Premier League in 2013, the FA Cup in 2016 and the Europa League in 2017, and was appointed club captain in 2019.

In 2020, Young signed for Inter Milan, with whom he won the Serie A title, becoming only the third Englishman to win Italy's top flight league. He returned to his former club Aston Villa in 2021, helping them to a 7th-placed finish in his second season, and subsequently signed for Everton in 2023. In 2025, he signed a one-year deal with Ipswich after being released by Everton.

Young earned 39 caps for England between 2007 and 2018, scoring seven international goals. He was part of the squads for UEFA Euro 2012 and the 2018 FIFA World Cup, reaching the semi-finals of the latter.

== Club career ==
=== Watford ===
Young joined the Watford academy system at 10 years of age. He developed there until the summer of 2001, when he was informed by the club that he wouldn't receive a full scholarship and could look for another football team. Despite initially being rejected, Young continued his association with the club on a part-time basis, working to develop his skills and demonstrate his potential to earn a place in the first-team squad. He started to train with the Under-18s, despite being 16, and was starting games by the end of the season. He progressed on to the Under-21s and was eventually offered a professional deal by the club. The 18-year-old was handed his first-team debut under Ray Lewington in September 2003, scoring as a substitute against Millwall. He achieved five substitute appearances that season, scoring three goals, and made his first start for the club in the League Cup. Young came to prominence in the 2004–05 season, playing a part in 34 of Watford's league matches as they struggled to survive in the Championship. Although he failed to find the net, his performance during this season earned him the club's Young Player of the Season award.

Under Aidy Boothroyd in the 2005–06 season, Young was given a new lease of life as a striker and right winger. Young started 41 League matches, finding the net 15 times, including a playoff semi-final goal against Crystal Palace, as Watford qualified for the play-offs and eventually beat Leeds United 3–0 to gain promotion to the Premier League. During that season, Young scored a number of spectacular goals, including free-kicks against Plymouth Argyle and Leeds, a shot into the top corner from 30 yards out against Coventry City, and a curling shot against Queens Park Rangers. It was during this season, though, that Young was sent off for the first time in his career, in the local derby away at Luton Town.

Young began Watford's 2006–07 Premier League season well, scoring three times in the league, including a last minute strike in a 3–3 draw with Fulham (he had also scored Watford's second goal in the match), and a goal against Middlesbrough, in Watford's first win of the season in October. He also scored a free-kick in a 2–1 home win over Hull City in the League Cup. In the January 2007 transfer window, three unnamed clubs made £5 million offers for the under-21 international. Watford rejected these approaches, as well as an offer of £7 million, again from an unnamed club. An improved offer of nearly £10 million from West Ham United was accepted. However, Young rejected the move, opting to wait for offers from clubs for whom relegation was not an issue.

=== Aston Villa ===
==== 2007–2009 ====
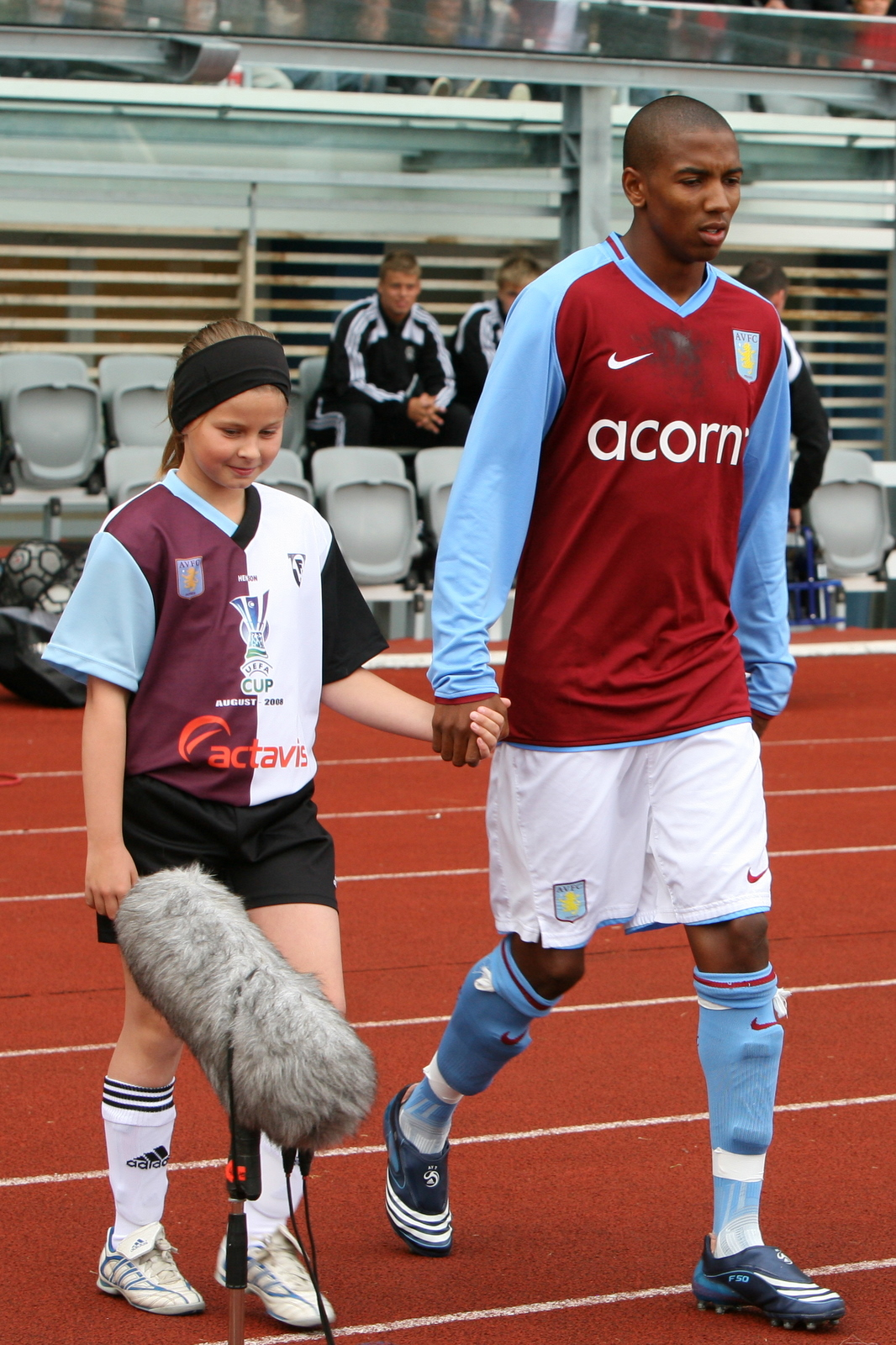
Young (right) with Aston Villa in 2008

On 23 January 2007, Aston Villa completed the signing of Young for a fee of £8 million (rising to £9.65 million with add-ons). At the time, this was the highest fee Aston Villa had ever paid for a player. On 31 January 2007, he scored on his debut for Villa at St James' Park against Newcastle United, but Villa went on to lose 3–1. Young started the 2007–08 season well, receiving several Man of the Match awards, culminating in a call-up to the England squad.

In the 2007–08 Premier League season, Young finished second to Cesc Fàbregas in assists with 17. Young was included in the Premier League Team of the Year, and apart from Portsmouth's David James, was the only other player who did not come from any of the 'Big Four' (Chelsea, Arsenal, Liverpool and Manchester United) to make it into the best XI of the season.

On 20 April 2008, Young scored two goals and assisted two goals for Aston Villa against Birmingham City at Villa Park and Villa went on to win the match 5–1. He also scored the winner against Danish club Odense Boldklub in Villa's home leg of the UEFA Intertoto Cup third round. On 10 October 2008, Young won the Premier League Player of the Month award. This was due to his performances in the 2008–09 Premier League season. Having also won the award in April 2008, Young joined the list of players who have won the award more than once including Cristiano Ronaldo, Wayne Rooney and Steven Gerrard. On 7 December 2008, in the 3–2 win over Everton, Young scored two goals, one being an injury time winner after Everton's Joleon Lescott had equalised seconds earlier. Young signed a new four-year contract until 2012 on 4 November 2008.

On 10 January 2009, Young was again awarded the Premier League Player of the Month award for December, along with O'Neill, who won the Manager of the Month award. He became the first ever player to win three Premier League Player of the Month awards in the same year. During a match against Sunderland on 18 January 2009, Young was sent off for a two-footed foul on Sunderland's Dean Whitehead. On 26 April 2009, he won the PFA Young Player of the Year award.

==== 2009–2011 ====
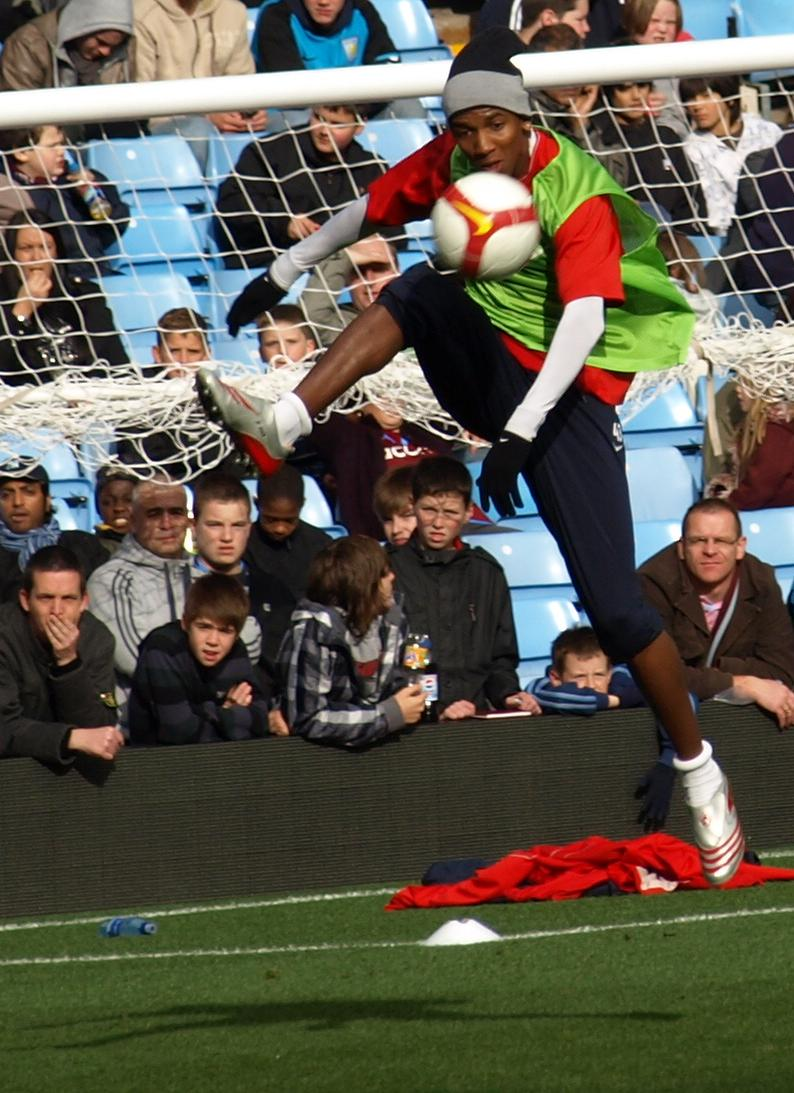
Young training with Aston Villa in 2009

On 24 August 2009, Young scored a penalty as Aston Villa won 3–1 against Liverpool at Anfield. He did, however, miss a penalty three days later in a home tie in the UEFA Europa League against Rapid Wien. Young won two penalties in the first half of the match (one that he missed, the other that was converted by James Milner) as Aston Villa were eliminated from the tournament on the away goals rule.

During the 2010–11 season, Young became vice-captain of the club and played in a new free role behind the striker, allowing him to move from wing to wing and through the centre. Young scored his first goal of the 2010–11 season with a direct free-kick in the Premier League match at home to Bolton Wanderers on 18 September 2010. He ended the season with nine goals and fourteen assists in 39 appearances for Villa in all competitions. With one year left to run on his current contract, Young stated that he would not make a decision on his future until the end of the season. On 20 June 2011, new Villa manager Alex McLeish admitted that he was resigned to losing Young, stating, "It's not confirmed yet but it does seem likely."

=== Manchester United ===
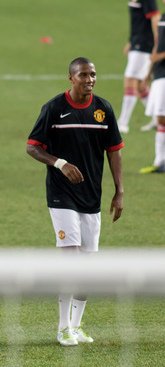
Young training with Manchester United in 2011

==== 2011–2014 ====
On 23 June 2011, Young completed a move to Manchester United for an undisclosed fee, reportedly around £17 million, having passed a medical the day before, beating Liverpool to the signing. He signed a five-year deal with the club. He was handed the number 18 shirt previously worn by Paul Scholes. He made his debut for United in a 3–2 derby win over Manchester City in the 2011 FA Community Shield, playing the full 90 minutes and making an assist.

He made his league debut for United against West Bromwich Albion on 14 August 2011, setting up the first goal for Wayne Rooney and forcing an own goal after a run down the left flank and cross, in a 2–1 away win. He scored his first two goals for United on 28 August in an 8–2 victory against Arsenal at Old Trafford. Both occurring after cutting inside from the left flank and bending two right foot shots into the far corner. Young made his debut in the UEFA Champions League on 27 September 2011, scoring a headed goal in the 90th minute to help Manchester United to a 3–3 draw against Basel. After a long-term injury, Young returned on the field at Stamford Bridge in a 3–3 Premier League draw against Chelsea on 5 February 2012. On 16 February, he scored a goal for the lead in a Europa League 2–0 away win against Ajax at the Amsterdam Arena. On 4 March 2012, Young scored two goals and made an assist against Tottenham Hotspur at White Hart Lane in a 3–1 Premier League win. On 2 April, he scored in a 2–0 win against Blackburn Rovers at Ewood Park.

==== 2014–2017 ====
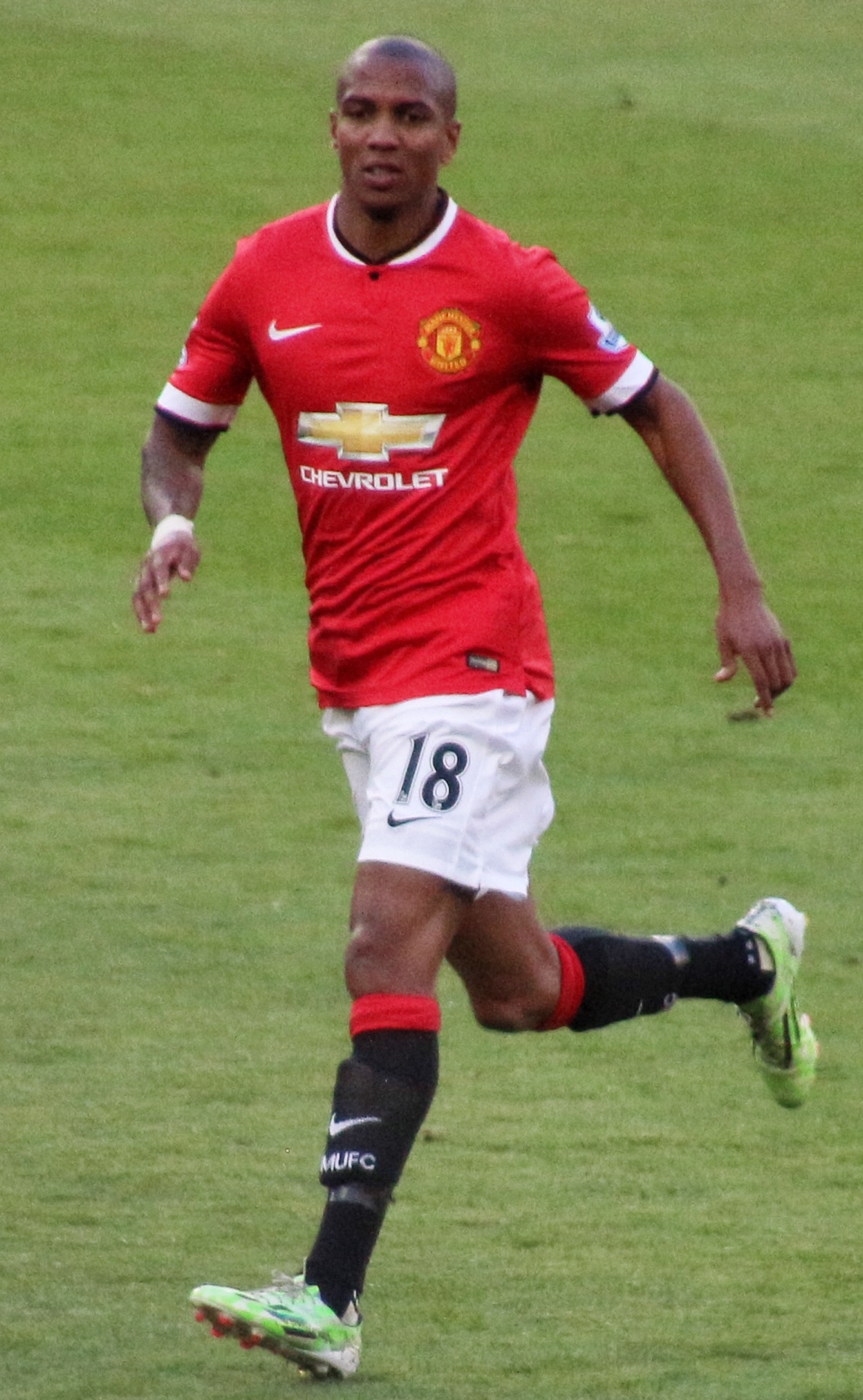
Young playing for Manchester United in 2015

After playing the position in pre-season, Young started in Louis van Gaal's first competitive game on 16 August 2014 as a wing-back in a 3–5–2 formation, which saw United lose 2–1 to Swansea City. He suffered a hamstring injury during a 1–1 draw against Stoke City on 1 January 2015. Young made his return on 3 February in a 3–0 win against Cambridge United, coming on in the 81st minute for Marcos Rojo. On 4 March, Young scored his first goal of the season in a 1–0 victory over Newcastle United. On 12 April, he was named Man of the Match after he scored the equalising goal and provided two assists in a 4–2 home win over Manchester City. He played an instrumental role in United's 2–1 win over Crystal Palace on 9 May, winning a penalty which Juan Mata converted and providing the assist for Marouane Fellaini's header, leading to him again being Man of the Match. In the following match on 17 May, Young provided an assist for Ander Herrera's volley against Arsenal, which finished in a 1–1 draw. Young spent the season playing both on the wing and at wing-back under Van Gaal, the latter being a position which the manager felt was his best.

On 7 August 2015, Young signed a new three-year contract with Manchester United, keeping him at the club until June 2018, with the option to extend a further year. Young made only one start in United's opening seven Premier League games, this being in the opening game on 8 August 2015, a 1–0 win against Tottenham Hotspur. On 12 September, Young played through debutant Anthony Martial to score his first goal for United in a 3–1 victory against rivals Liverpool. Young returned to the starting XI at left-back on 4 October against Arsenal, ending in a 3–0 away defeat. He started at right-back against West Brom on 7 November, which ended in a 2–0 win for United; this was a position he frequently played during November, December and January due to injury to Antonio Valencia.

On 2 January 2016, Young assisted Anthony Martial with a cross into the box to open the scoring against Swansea City, with the game ending in a 2–1 win for United. Young suffered a 'severe groin injury' against Liverpool on 17 January which led to him being sidelined for several months. He made his return on 10 April against Tottenham Hotspur, replacing Marcus Rashford at half time, playing upfront in a 3–0 defeat. The decision to play Young as a striker saw Van Gaal face heavy criticism, however the Dutchman defended his actions by explaining he "wanted more running in behind." Young scored his only goal of the season on 17 May, the last day of the Premier League, in a 3–1 win against AFC Bournemouth after coming on as a substitute for Anthony Martial. On 21 May, he won the FA Cup after defeating Crystal Palace 2–1 in the final after extra time, playing at both striker and left-back after replacing Marcus Rashford in the 72nd minute – marking his third domestic trophy with the club.

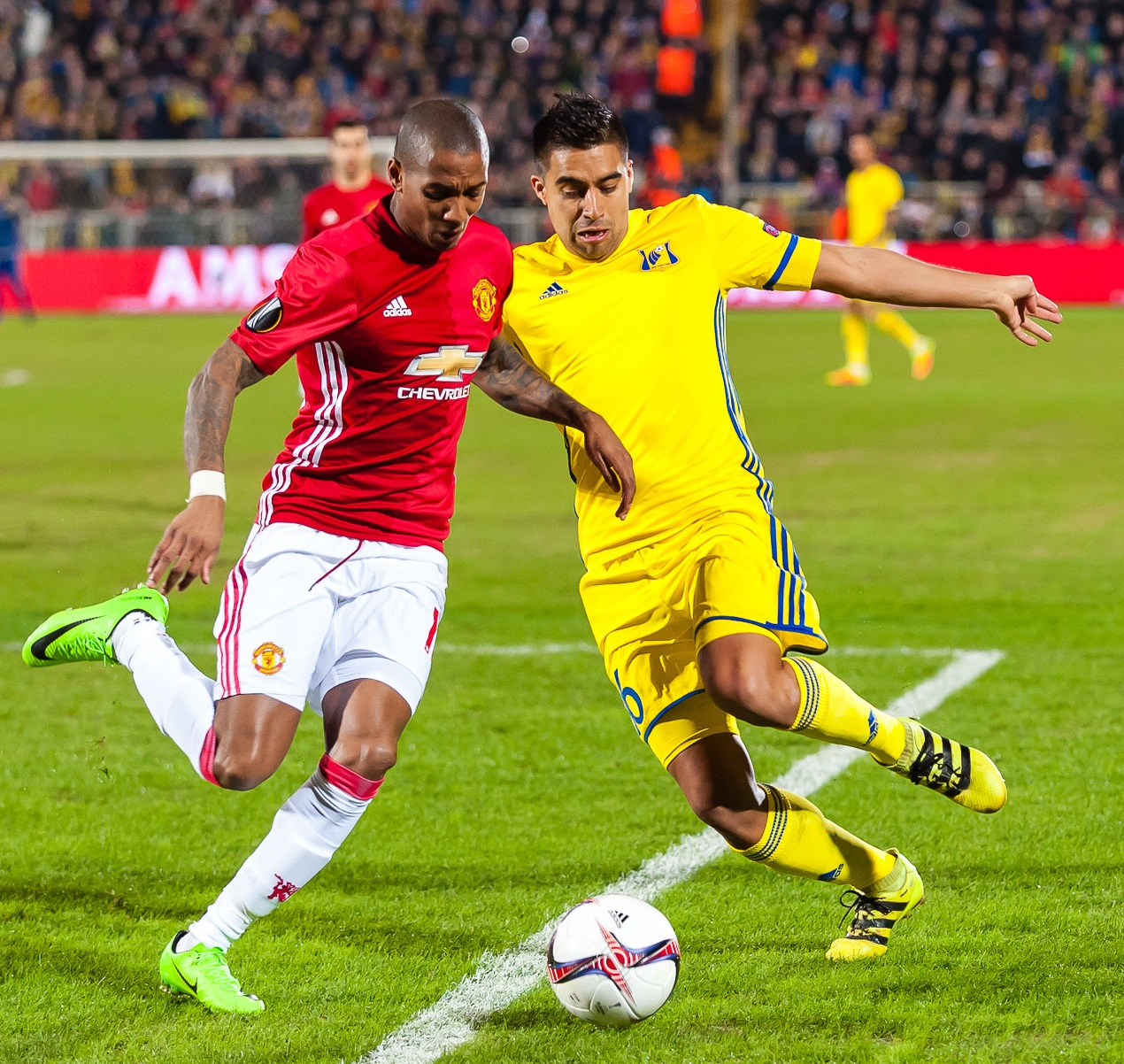
Young (left) playing for Manchester United in 2017

The appointment of José Mourinho as manager led to Young's game time being limited in the first half of the season. His first appearance was on 15 September 2016 in the Europa League against Feyenoord, coming on as a 63rd-minute substitute for Juan Mata in a 1–0 loss. His first start was against Northampton Town in the EFL Cup on 21 September, with Young playing on the wing in a 3–1 victory. Young featured in the next two games as a substitute, against Leicester City in a 4–1 league victory on 24 September and on 29 September against Zorya Luhansk in a 1–0 win in the Europa League. From October to January, Young managed to only make four appearances – all of which came as starts at wing-back or at full-back. Despite being limited for chances, one of these came against rivals Liverpool on 17 October, in a 0–0 draw at Anfield.

Young's next start came against Blackburn Rovers in the FA Cup on 19 February 2017, playing the full 90 minutes in the 2–1 away win. After this game Young started to play far more regularly, featuring heavily in March and April. He was an unused substitute for the 2017 EFL Cup Final against Southampton on 26 February, which United won 3–2. Young made his first assist of the season on 19 March against Middlesbrough, crossing the ball to Marouane Fellaini, who headed in the opening goal of a 3–1 victory. On 16 April, Young captained Manchester United for the first time in a 2–0 win against Chelsea. His season ended after suffering an injury against Celta Vigo in the Europa League semi-final first leg on 4 May, after coming on for Henrikh Mkhitaryan in the 78th minute.

==== 2017–2020 ====
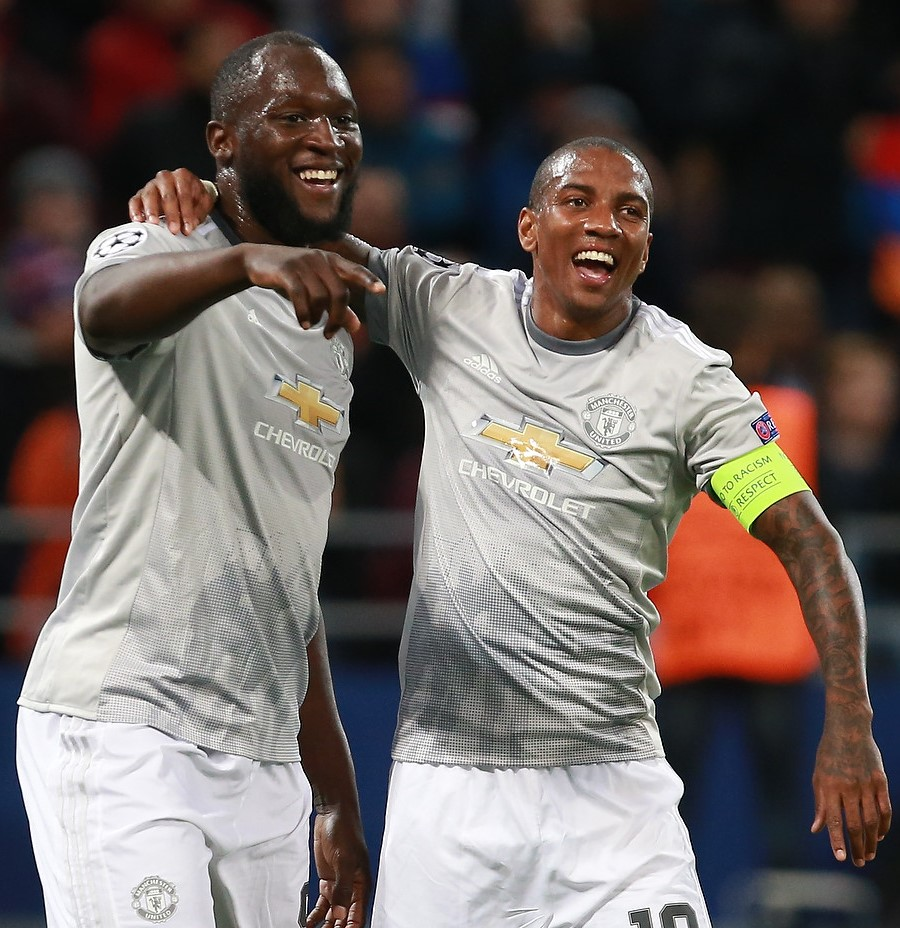
Young (right), with teammate Romelu Lukaku, playing for Manchester United in 2017

Young's first start of the campaign came at right-back on 12 September 2017 in a 3–0 win against Basel in the Champions League, assisting with the opening goal with a cross to Marouane Fellaini in the 35th minute, he was also captain for the match. His performance led him to start at left-back in United's 4–0 victory over Everton on 17 September. On 28 November, Young scored a brace for the first time since March 2012 against his former club Watford, the opening two goals, one of them being a 30-yard freekick into the top left corner, in a 4–2 win at Vicarage Road.

In February 2019, Young signed a new contract with Manchester United until 2020. He was appointed as United's club captain in August 2019.

Young scored the final goal of his Manchester United career on 12 December 2019, scoring the first in a 4–0 victory against AZ Alkmaar in the group stages of the Europa League.

=== Inter Milan ===
Young signed for Italian Serie A club Inter Milan on 17 January 2020 for the remainder of the 2019–20 season, taking the number 15 shirt as the number 18 that he wore at Manchester United was occupied by Kwadwo Asamoah. His contract also included an option to extend for another season. The transfer fee was reportedly around €1.5 million (£1.28 million). He became one of three former Premier League players to have signed for Inter Milan in the same window, with Victor Moses and Christian Eriksen joining the club soon after. In his first game for the club, Young provided the assist for Lautaro Martínez in a 1–1 draw against Cagliari. He scored his first goal for the club in a 2–1 loss against Lazio on 16 February.

Inter won the 2020–21 Serie A. Young became only the third Englishman to win the league title in Italy, the first being Jimmy Greaves in 1962 with AC Milan and Gerry Hitchens in 1963, also with the Nerazzurri.

=== Return to Aston Villa ===
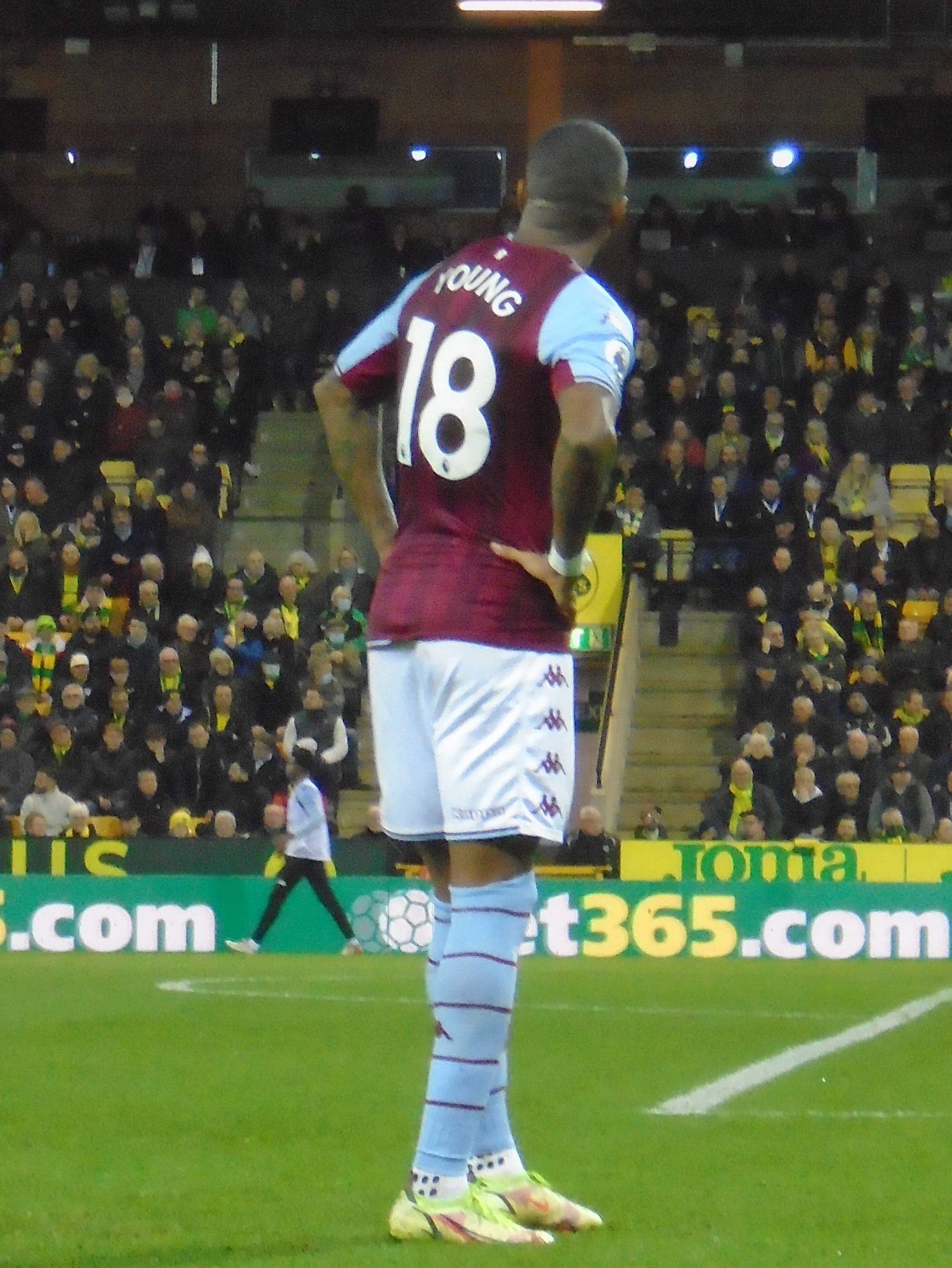
Young playing for Aston Villa in 2021

On 17 June 2021, Young signed a one-year contract with Aston Villa to return to the club on a free transfer for a second spell. He officially joined Villa on 1 July, when his Inter contract expired. Upon arrival at Aston Villa he was handed the number 18 shirt that he wore during his time at Manchester United, rather than the number 7 he wore during his first spell at the club. Young made his second debut for Villa on 14 August in a 3–2 defeat at former club Watford.

On 10 June 2022, Young was released by Villa. He became a free agent on 1 July, but on 4 July, the club confirmed that Young had re-signed for another season until 2023. On 27 July, Young was named club captain for the upcoming season, with John McGinn being named on-field captain. On 10 October, he scored from 25 yards against Nottingham Forest in a 1–1 away draw in the Premier League. It was his first goal in his second spell at Villa, with his previous for The Villans coming in 2011.

On 31 May 2023, Villa announced that Young's contract would not be renewed, and he left the club on 30 June.

=== Everton ===
On 13 July 2023, Everton announced the signing of Young as a free agent on a one-year contract with an option for a further 12 months, in which he continued to wear his number 18. On 12 August 2023, he made his official debut, playing the full match in a 1–0 loss against Fulham in the Premier League.

On 17 May 2024, the club said it had offered Young a new one-year contract. On 4 December 2024, Young became Everton's oldest goalscorer at the age of 39 years and five months with a 20-yard free-kick in a 4–0 victory against Wolverhampton Wanderers. This goal also makes him the fourth-oldest goalscorer in the history of the Premier League, only behind Thiago Silva, Dean Windass, and Teddy Sheringham. In May 2025, the club announced that Young would leave at the end of the 2024–25 season at the expiration of his contract.

=== Ipswich Town ===
On 23 July 2025, Young signed a one-year contract with Ipswich Town, returning to the Championship for the first time in over two decades. On 8 August, he made his debut for the club, coming on as a substitute in a 1–1 draw against Birmingham City in the league. On 30 April 2026, Young announced that he would retire from playing at the end of the season, having made 15 appearances in all competitions for the club.

== International career ==
=== Under-21s ===
As a result of his form for Watford during the 2005–06 season, in February 2006 Young earned a call-up to Peter Taylor's England Under-21 League squad to face an Italian Serie B squad alongside teammate Chris Eagles. Young started alongside Eagles in the 1–0 win, playing the first half. His continued form into the 2006–07 season earned him a first England under-21 call-up to face Switzerland in September 2006. Young played the last 15 minutes of the match as England scored a late goal to win 3–2, topping their group, and reaching a play-off for a place in the 2007 UEFA European Under-21 Championship. At the finals, Young played three times. He took part in the semi-final penalty shoot-out against hosts Netherlands, scoring twice in the shoot-out as England lost 13–12. From 2006 to 2007, he earned 10 caps for the under-21s.

=== Senior team ===
==== Early career ====
On 31 August 2007, Steve McClaren called Young up to the full England squad for the first time, to face Russia and Israel in the UEFA Euro 2008 qualifiers. He was again called up for the Euro 2008 qualifiers to face Estonia and Russia. On 16 November 2007, Young made his international debut, by coming on as a half-time substitute for England in a friendly against Austria. He then appeared in the England friendly against Germany in November 2008, coming on as a second-half substitute. He was also part of the starting XI in Fabio Capello's England squad in the friendly against the Netherlands at the Amsterdam Arena on 12 August 2009. Young did not make the cut in Capello's 30-man squad for the 2010 World Cup in South Africa.

==== UEFA Euro 2012 ====
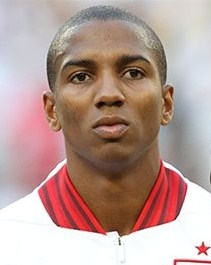
Young lining up for England at UEFA Euro 2012

On 12 October 2010, Young made his first start for England in a Euro 2012 qualifying match against Montenegro. He scored his first international goal in a friendly away to Denmark on 9 February 2011 in Copenhagen, which was the winning goal. Young also scored again against Switzerland on 4 June 2011, as he got the equaliser with a volley from the edge of the area, after coming off the bench for Frank Lampard at half-time. On 6 September 2011, Young scored the only goal for England in a Euro 2012 qualifying 1–0 win against Wales. On 7 October 2011, he scored England's first goal away against Montenegro, and set up Darren Bent for the second. England drew the match 2–2 to secure qualification for UEFA Euro 2012. On 29 February 2012, Young scored his fifth international goal in a 3–2 home loss to the Netherlands in a friendly match played at Wembley Stadium.

On 26 May 2012, Young scored his sixth, as well as his fourth straight, international goal in a UEFA Euro 2012 warm-up match against Norway. He became the first English footballer since Wayne Rooney to score in four straight international appearances. In his next match for England against Belgium he provided the assist for England's first goal. Young played in all four of England's matches at Euro 2012, culminating with a quarter-final defeat to Italy on penalties; Young was one of two England players to miss his penalty as Italy won 4–2 to reach a semi-final against Germany. He and the other unsuccessful player, Ashley Cole, faced online racial abuse for the miss, which was investigated by the police.

==== 2018 World Cup ====
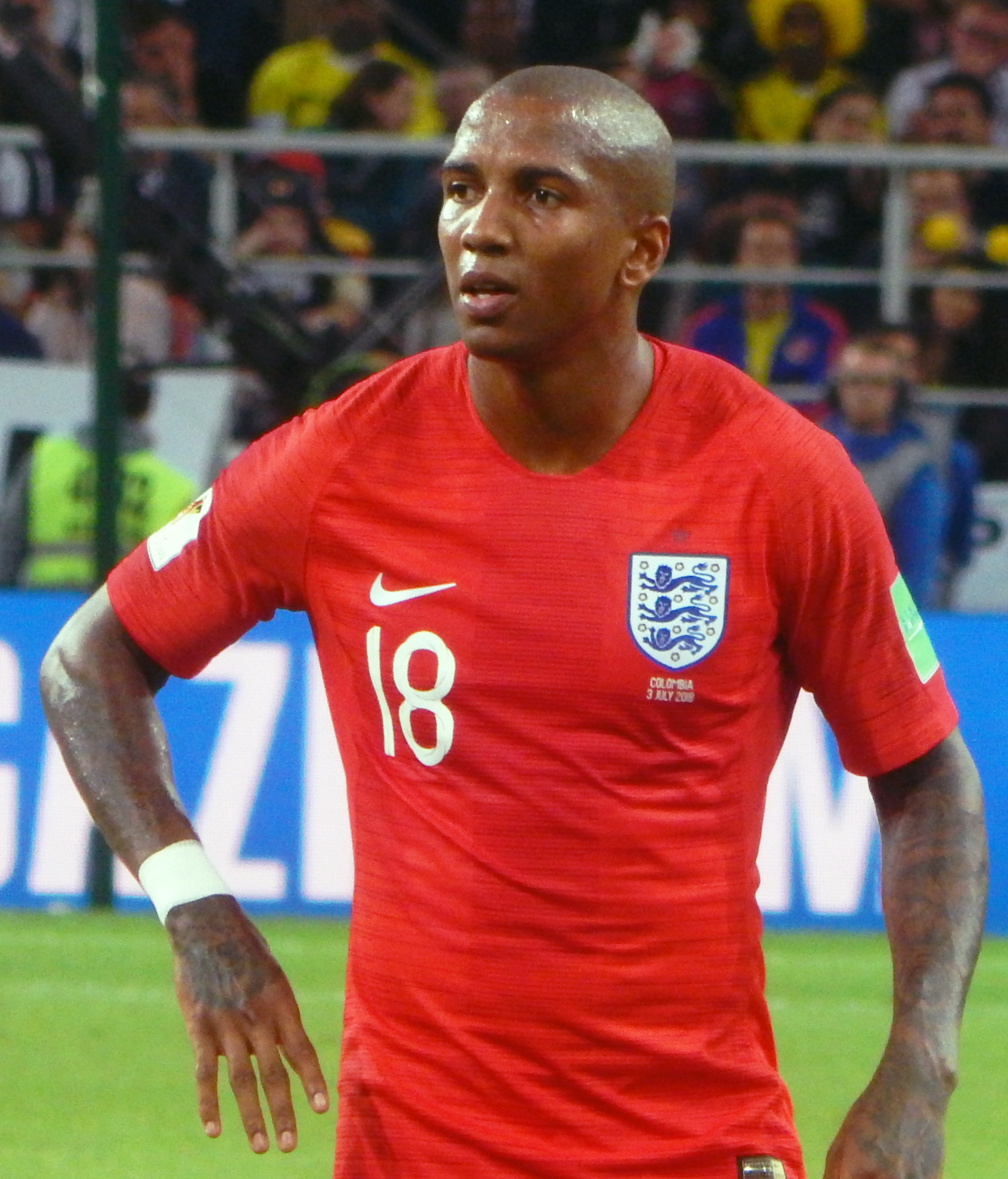
Young for England during the 2018 FIFA World Cup

After not being called up to the national team for almost four years, Young was recalled by Gareth Southgate for the upcoming friendly matches against Germany and Brazil on 2 November 2017. He featured in the latter game on 14 November, coming on for Ryan Bertrand in the 80th minute, seeing out a 0–0 draw.

Young was named in Southgate's 23-man squad for the 2018 FIFA World Cup. He was England's first-choice left-back in Russia, playing the entirety of their first two group matches against Tunisia and Panama. With qualification for the knockout stage secure after winning both matches, Young was rested for the final game against Belgium, before returning for the round of 16 tie against Group H winners Colombia. That match went to extra time, but Young was replaced by Danny Rose 12 minutes into the additional period and played no part in the penalty shoot-out after the match finished as a 1–1 draw. England won 4–3 on penalties and progressed to a quarter-final against Sweden, against whom Young again played the full 90 minutes as England won 2–0, with Young providing the assist for Harry Maguire's opening goal from a corner. In the semi-final against Croatia, Young again started the match, but was again replaced by Rose at the start of extra time, with the score at 1–1 after 90 minutes. England ultimately lost the match 2–1 after extra time, and Young did not play in the third-place play-off against Belgium.

== Style of play ==
Young has played in a variety of positions: though for most of his career chiefly a winger, he has also experienced game-time as a forward – under Aidy Boothroyd at Watford and once under Louis Van Gaal at Manchester United – as well as in a free role behind the striker for Aston Villa.

During his later years at United, Young was re-invented as a defender, deployed as a left-sided full-back or wing-back. WhoScored's Martin Laurence stated in 2018 that "Luke Shaw can't get a kick at Manchester United and that is down to the form of Ashley Young, who has adapted to another new role superbly. Young is now proving to be an aggressive and intelligent defender, all while still offering a threat going forwards with his delivery into the box. On current form the 32-year-old shouldn't just make the cut, but be considered as England's first choice."

Young has courted controversy, having been accused of diving by the press and has been spoken to by former managers Sir Alex Ferguson and David Moyes about diving to gain an unfair advantage.

== Personal life ==
Young was born in Stevenage, Hertfordshire. He has one older brother and two football-playing younger brothers, Lewis, who made his debut for Watford in 2008, and Kyle, who in April 2009 was training at the Arsenal Academy. Young attended The John Henry Newman School in Stevenage, and played school football alongside Formula One driver Lewis Hamilton, who was in the same year. Young's Jamaican-born father supports Tottenham Hotspur, while Young himself, like his older brother, favoured Arsenal. His hero and "role model on and off the pitch" was Ian Wright. Young has been married to Nicky Pike since June 2015. They had planned a wedding in 2011 but called it off two days before. His son Tyler Young is also a professional footballer.

== Career statistics ==
=== Club ===
Appearances and goals by club, season and competition
Club	Season	League			National cup (Note: Includes FA Cup and Coppa Italia)		League cup (Note: Includes Football League/EFL Cup)		Europe		Other		Total	
Club	Season	Division	Apps	Goals	Apps	Goals	Apps	Goals	Apps	Goals	Apps	Goals	Apps	Goals
Watford	2003–04	First Division	5	3	0	0	1	0	—		—		6	3
Watford	2004–05	Championship	34	0	0	0	4	0	—		—		38	0
Watford	2005–06	Championship	39	13	0	0	1	1	—		3 (Note: Appearances in Championship play-offs)	1	43	15
Watford	2006–07	Premier League	20	3	1	0	2	1	—		—		23	4
Watford	Total		98	19	1	0	8	2	—		3	1	110	22
Aston Villa	2006–07	Premier League	13	2	—		—		—		—		13	2
Aston Villa	2007–08	Premier League	37	9	1	0	1	0	—		—		39	9
Aston Villa	2008–09	Premier League	36	7	3	0	1	0	8 (Note: Two appearances and one goal in UEFA Intertoto Cup, six appearances and one goal in UEFA Cup)	2	—		48	9
Aston Villa	2009–10	Premier League	37	5	6	2	5	2	2 (Note: Appearance(s) in UEFA Europa League)	0	—		50	9
Aston Villa	2010–11	Premier League	34	7	2	0	3	2	1	0	—		40	9
Aston Villa	Total		157	30	12	2	10	4	11	2	—		190	38
Manchester United	2011–12	Premier League	25	6	0	0	0	0	7 (Note: Three appearances and one goal in UEFA Champions League, four appearances and one goal in UEFA Europa League)	2	1 (Note: Appearance in FA Community Shield)	0	33	8
Manchester United	2012–13	Premier League	19	0	2	0	0	0	2 (Note: Appearances in UEFA Champions League)	0	—		23	0
Manchester United	2013–14	Premier League	20	2	0	0	2	1	8	0	0	0	30	3
Manchester United	2014–15	Premier League	26	2	3	0	0	0	—		—		29	2
Manchester United	2015–16	Premier League	18	1	1	0	2	0	5	0	—		26	1
Manchester United	2016–17	Premier League	12	0	3	0	1	0	7	0	0	0	23	0
Manchester United	2017–18	Premier League	30	2	4	0	0	0	4	0	0	0	38	2
Manchester United	2018–19	Premier League	30	2	3	0	1	0	7	0	—		41	2
Manchester United	2019–20	Premier League	12	0	1	0	2	0	3	1	—		18	1
Manchester United	Total		192	15	17	0	8	1	43	3	1	0	261	19
Inter Milan	2019–20	Serie A	18	4	2	0	—		5	0	—		25	4
Inter Milan	2020–21	Serie A	26	1	3	0	—		5	0	—		34	1
Inter Milan	Total		44	5	5	0	—		10	0	—		59	5
Aston Villa	2021–22	Premier League	24	0	0	0	1	0	—		—		25	0
Aston Villa	2022–23	Premier League	29	1	1	0	2	0	—		—		32	1
Aston Villa	Total		53	1	1	0	3	0	—		—		57	1
Everton	2023–24	Premier League	31	0	0	0	3	1	—		—		34	1
Everton	2024–25	Premier League	32	1	2	0	2	0	—		—		36	1
Everton	Total		63	1	2	0	5	1	—		—		70	2
Ipswich Town	2025–26	Championship	13	0	1	0	1	0	—		—		15	0
Career total			620	71	39	2	35	8	64	5	4	1	763	87

=== International ===
Appearances and goals by national team and year
National team	Year	Apps	Goals
England	2007	1	0
England	2008	3	0
England	2009	3	0
England	2010	4	0
England	2011	7	4
England	2012	9	2
England	2013	3	1
England	2014	0	0
England	2015	0	0
England	2016	0	0
England	2017	1	0
England	2018	8	0
Total		39	7

Scores and results list England's goal tally first, score column indicates score after each Young goal.

List of international goals scored by Ashley Young
No.	Date	Venue	Cap	Opponent	Score	Result	Competition	Ref.
1	9 February 2011	Parken Stadium, Copenhagen, Denmark	12	Denmark	2–1	2–1	Friendly	
2	4 June 2011	Wembley Stadium, London, England	15	Switzerland	2–2	2–2	UEFA Euro 2012 qualification	
3	6 September 2011	Wembley Stadium, London, England	17	Wales	1–0	1–0	UEFA Euro 2012 qualification	
4	7 October 2011	Podgorica City Stadium, Podgorica, Montenegro	18	Montenegro	1–0	2–2	UEFA Euro 2012 qualification	
5	29 February 2012	Wembley Stadium, London, England	19	Netherlands	2–2	2–3	Friendly	
7	22 March 2013	San Marino Stadium, Serravalle, San Marino	28	San Marino	4–0	8–0	2014 FIFA World Cup qualification	

== Honours ==
Watford

- Football League Championship play-offs: 2006

Aston Villa

- Football League Cup runner-up: 2009–10

Manchester United

- Premier League: 2012–13
- FA Cup: 2015–16; runner-up: 2017–18
- EFL Cup: 2016–17
- FA Community Shield: 2011
- UEFA Europa League: 2016–17

Inter Milan

- Serie A: 2020–21
- UEFA Europa League runner-up: 2019–20

Ipswich Town

- EFL Championship runner-up: 2025–26

Individual

- Watford Young Player of the Season: 2004–05
- PFA Team of the Year: 2005–06 Championship, 2007–08 Premier League, 2008–09 Premier League
- PFA Young Player of the Year: 2008–09
- Premier League Player of the Month: April 2008, September 2008, December 2008
- Peace Cup 2009: Golden Ball (best player)
