= Junior Osborne =

English footballer

Personal information
- Full name: Junior Osborne
- Date of birth: 12 February 1988 (age 38)
- Place of birth: Watford, England
- Height: 5 ft 11 1/2 in (1.82 m)
- Position: Defender

Youth career
- 2001–2005: Watford

Senior career*
Years	Team	Apps	(Gls)
2005–2008	Watford	19	(0)
2006	→ Kidderminster Harriers (loan)	3	(0)
2008	Aldershot Town	8	(0)
2010	Wealdstone	12	(0)
2011–2012	Northwood	7	(0)
2018	Hendon	3	(0)
2018–2019	Kings Langley	12	(0)
2019	Hendon	?	(?)

International career
- England U16/U17
- * Club domestic league appearances and goals as of 18:23, 3 August 2018 (UTC)

Junior Osborne (born 12 February 1988) is an English footballer who plays as a full back or center-back.

Osborne started his career at hometown club Watford and made his first team debut whilst still a member of the club's academy. Aged 17, he started against West Ham United on the final day of the 2004–05 Championship season. Having made two more appearances for Watford in 2005–06, he was sent on loan to Conference side Kidderminster Harriers in February 2006, making three appearances.

He was released by Watford in August 2008, having struggled with three separate major ACL knee injuries during his time at the club, and joined Aldershot Town on 10 September. He played eight times for the League Two club up to 1 November 2008, but none thereafter as he suffered a 4 ACL knee injury and he was released in late December.

After a brief spell with Wealdstone between January and July 2010, Osborne again had issues with his knees and took a break from the game.

Osborne then played in Northwood's friendly win over Brentford XI on 30 July 2011, and played in their first league game of the campaign away against Ashford Town on 13 August 2011. Having also participated in Northwood's home game versus Daventry Town on 20 August, Osborne's signing was confirmed on 21 August.

After signing for Northwood, Osborne impressed with a number of outstanding displays, but while playing against Sittingbourne in the FA Trophy preliminary round on 8 October 2011, he was taken off after injuring his knee yet again - the sixth time he had suffered such a serious injury in quick succession. In early 2012, Osborne announced his intention to retire from football having suffered another set back with injury. In total, Osborne played nine games for Northwood, seven of them in the league.

After some six years out of football, Osborne made a surprise return in the summer of 2018 by signing for Hendon. He played there for three months before joining Kings Langley. He re-joined Hendon in March 2019.
