= Ben Gill =

English footballer (born 1987)

Personal information
- Full name: Benjamin David Gill
- Date of birth: 4 October 1987 (age 39)
- Place of birth: Harrow, England
- Height: 6 ft 2 in (1.88 m)
- Positions: Central defender; midfielder

Team information
- Current team: Chalfont St Peter

Youth career
- Arsenal

Senior career*
| Years | Team | Apps | (Gls) |
| 2005–2007 | Watford | 4 | (0) |
| 2006 | → Cambridge United (loan) | 4 | (0) |
| 2007–2009 | Cheltenham Town | 15 | (2) |
| 2009 | Crawley Town | 4 | (0) |
| 2009 | Weymouth | 9 | (0) |
| 2009–2010 | Interblock | 34 | (0) |
| 2010 | Forest Green Rovers | 4 | (0) |
| 2010 | Rayners Lane | 8 | (?) |
| 2010–2011 | Wealdstone | 12 | (?) |
| 2021–2022 | Chalfont St Peter | 9 | (1) |
| 2021 | → Ascot United (loan) | 1 | (0) |

Managerial career
- 2022: Chalfont St Peter (caretaker)
- * Club domestic league appearances and goals as of 12 March 2022

Benjamin David Gill (born 4 October 1987) is an English footballer. He plays either as a central midfielder or central defender and most recently played for Chalfont St Peter.

== Career ==
Born in Harrow, Benjamin David Gill started his career as a youth player at Arsenal but was released in July 2005 and joined the academy of Championship side Watford. Whilst still an academy scholar Gill made his first team debut in a League Cup victory against Wolverhampton Wanderers on 20 September 2005, coming on as a substitute. Gill went on to make two further substitute appearances in the League Cup and FA Cup respectively, against Premier League sides Wigan Athletic and Bolton Wanderers.

Watford were promoted to the Premiership at the end of 2005–06 season and Gill was awarded a professional contract. In October 2006, Ben joined then Conference side Cambridge United on a month's loan, to cover injuries sustained by the Yellows. Gill was involved in 4 matches, starting 3 times. After his return, Gill was unable to break into the first-team. At the end of the season he was released and subsequently signed a two-year contract with League One side Cheltenham Town, on 15 May 2007. He played fifteen times for the club before being he was released early from his contract in January 2009. Gill signed for Crawley Town in February 2009, signing until the end of the 2009. Signed on non-contract terms for Weymouth, in March 2009 until the end of the season. In July 2009 Ben signed with Interblock from Slovenia.

His spell in Slovenia was ended in September 2010 however, when he returned to England and signed for Forest Green Rovers.

After only a few games for Forest Green, Gill departed The New Lawn and spent a small amount of time at Rayners Lane before moving on to Isthmian Premier Division side Wealdstone in November 2010. After making 12 league appearances he left Wealdstone. Gill then spent time training with Lincoln City.

In October 2021, Gill signed for Chalfont St Peter and was then loaned to Ascot United for their Combined Counties League match at home to North Greenford United. Ben made his debut for The Saints on 23 November 2021 in their home Isthmian League match against Bedfont Sports.

Gill took over as caretaker manager of Chalfont St Peter on 7 February 2022 after the resignation of Aaron Steadman.
