= Aidy Boothroyd =

English football manager (born 1971)

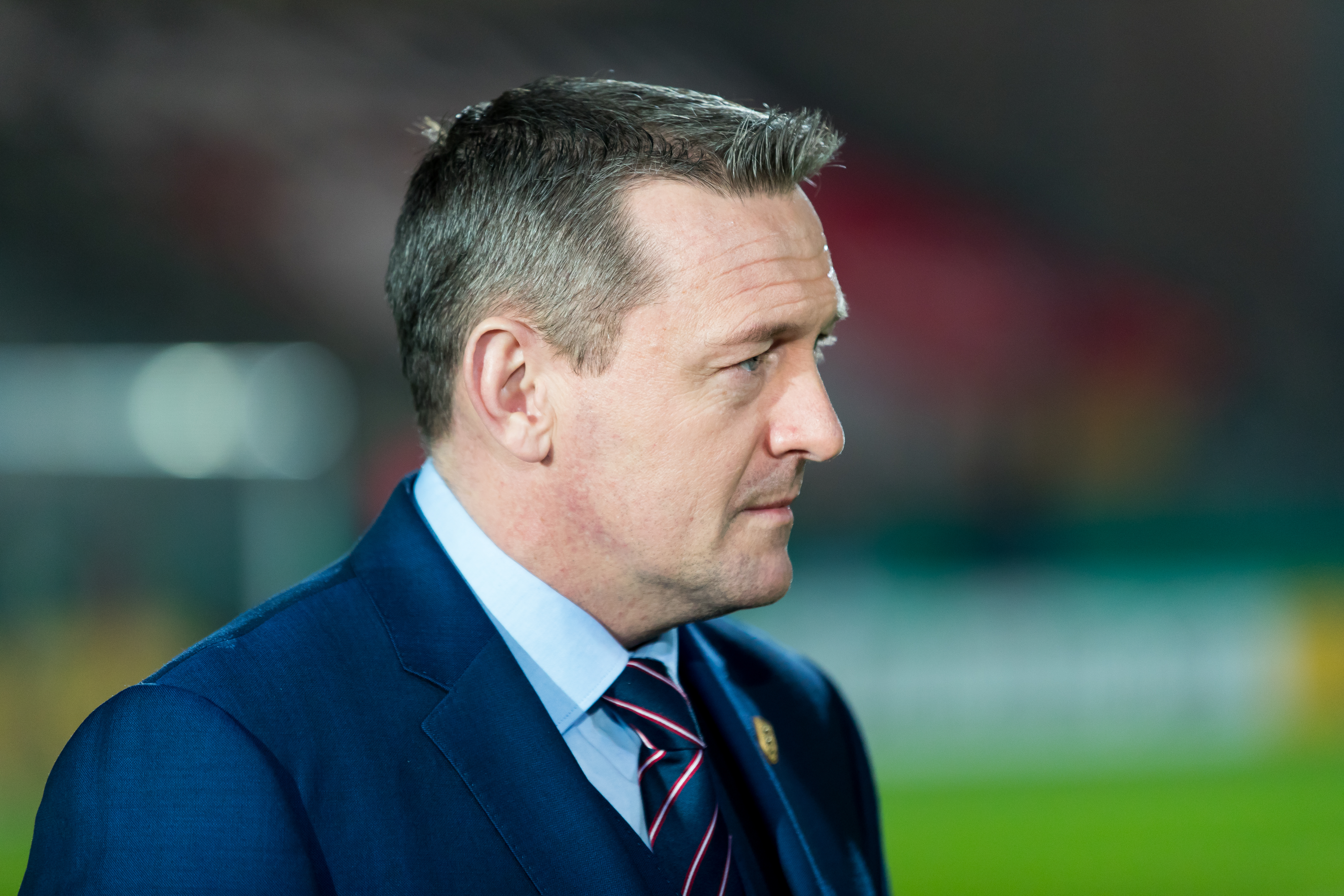
- Boothroyd as England U21 manager, 2017

Personal information
- Full name: Adrian Neil Boothroyd
- Date of birth: 8 February 1971 (age 55)
- Place of birth: Eccleshill, West Riding of Yorkshire, England
- Height: 5 ft 10 in (1.78 m)
- Position: Defender

Senior career*
Years	Team	Apps	(Gls)
1989–1990	Huddersfield Town	10	(0)
1990–1992	Bristol Rovers	16	(0)
1992–1993	Heart of Midlothian	4	(0)
1993–1996	Mansfield Town	102	(3)
1996–1998	Peterborough United	26	(1)
Total		158	(4)

Managerial career
- 2005–2008: Watford
- 2009–2010: Colchester United
- 2010–2011: Coventry City
- 2011–2013: Northampton Town
- 2014–2015: England U20
- 2015–2016: England U19
- 2016: England U20
- 2016–2021: England U21
- 2022–2023: Jamshedpur
- * Club domestic league appearances and goals

Adrian Neil Boothroyd (born 8 February 1971) is an English former footballer who was most recently the manager of Indian Super League club Jamshedpur.

At club level, he was manager of Watford from 2005 to 2008. During his time with Watford, he was regarded as one of the best young managers in England. At the time of his departure, he was the youngest and the second longest serving manager in the division.

Boothroyd then had short spells at Colchester United and Coventry City. In 2011, he replaced Gary Johnson at Northampton Town. After saving the club from relegation in the 2011–12 season, he took Northampton to the League Two play-off final in May 2013, only to be defeated in the final. After a poor start to the 2013–14 season, he was relieved of his duties on 21 December 2013, with the club bottom of the Football League.

== Playing career ==
Boothroyd was born in Eccleshill, West Riding of Yorkshire. He started as a youth team player at Huddersfield Town and made his first team debut for the club in 1989. He played 10 league matches before moving on to Bristol Rovers in 1990, where he played 16 games. In November 1992, Boothroyd was granted a release by Bristol Rovers, leading to a trial with Heart of Midlothian. After a successful trial at the Jam Tarts, he signed a 18 month contract with the club. Boothroyd scored two goals against Huntly in a 6–0 win in the Scottish Cup on 11 January 1993. After a short spell in Scotland with Heart of Midlothian, he signed for Mansfield Town, where he played 102 matches, scoring 3 goals in the process. He left the club in 1996 to play for Peterborough United. Boothroyd picked up a career-ending injury after playing 26 games and scoring a single goal. He retired from the game in 1998.

== Coaching career ==
After ending his playing career at Peterborough United, Boothroyd was appointed coach of the Under 17, Under 19 and reserve teams at the club. His tactical nous and drive impressed, and he left Peterborough in 2001 to join Norwich City as their youth team coach under Nigel Worthington. After two years at Carrow Road, Boothroyd assumed the positions of Youth Development Officer and Technical Director at West Bromwich Albion, joining in October 2003. A short spell at The Hawthorns ended, when he was appointed first-team coach at Leeds United in July 2004,

=== Watford ===
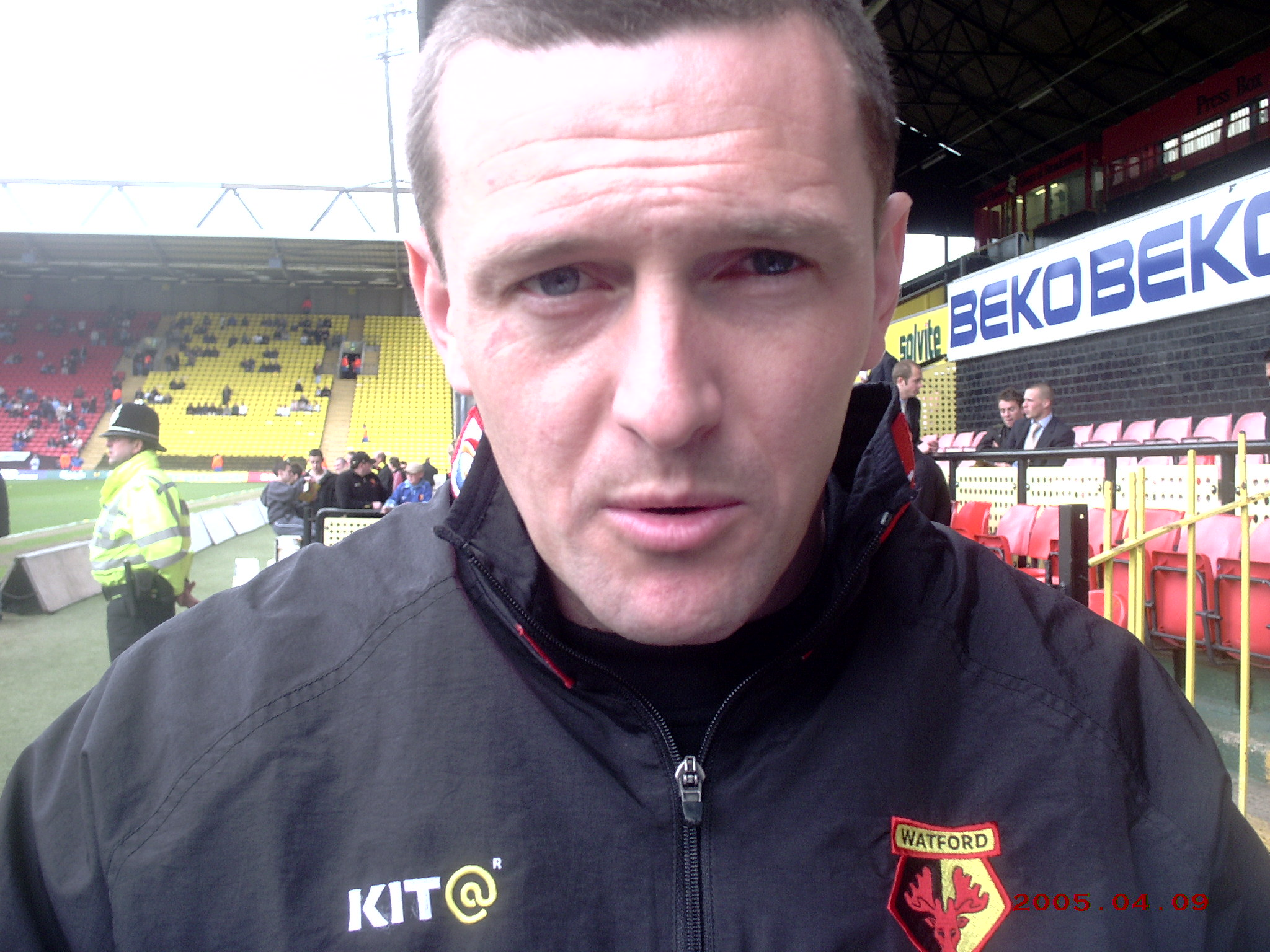
Boothroyd as Watford manager, 2005

Boothroyd was appointed manager of Watford in March 2005 at the age of 34. The board backed their decision despite initial scepticism by Watford fans and the club entered a new era under Boothroyd. He managed to steer the club clear of relegation, with 1–0 victories over Stoke City and Rotherham United.

At the beginning of the 2005–06 season, Boothroyd said that his aim for the forthcoming campaign would be promotion to the Premier League, although many pundits regarded the club as likely to be relegated. As the season progressed, though, the side gained more and more confidence, and finished in third place to secure a place in the play-offs. After overcoming Crystal Palace in the two-legged semi-final, Watford beat Leeds United 3–0 in the final to secure promotion to the Premier League. The rapid improvement in Watford's results in his first season in charge led to Boothroyd winning the Championship Manager of the Month in February 2006. Boothroyd continued as Watford manager for the duration of the 2006–07 season, but Watford finished 20th and were relegated. Nevertheless, they reached the FA Cup semi-finals, and Boothroyd was awarded a new three-year contract. In July 2006, he completed his UEFA Pro Licence in coaching.

"Professional footballers should be professional. They have a responsibility to come in, listen and learn, watch their performances, analyse where they went wrong and improve. Not to come in, have a five-a-side, bugger off and play golf. I get quite passionate because I was that person. I was a mercenary who went from club to club on a free transfer and, really, that's not how football should be. "

— Aidy Boothroyd

A good start to the 2007–08 season saw Watford twelve points clear at the top of the Championship after nineteen games. Boothroyd was named Championship Manager of the Month for October 2007 after Watford maintained a 100% record. However, their form dropped in the second half of the season, and Boothroyd was criticised for his team selections, direct style of play and dealings in the transfer market. One win in thirteen going into the last game of the season saw Watford in danger of missing out on a play-off spot altogether but a 1–1 draw against Blackpool was enough to secure sixth place on goal difference ahead of Wolverhampton Wanderers. In their play-off semi-final against Hull City Watford lost 2–0 at Vicarage Road and 4–1 at the KC Stadium.

After missing out on an immediate return to Premier League, Boothroyd announced his intention to re-build the side for the following season, and also change the team's style of play. However, he left Watford by mutual consent on 3 November 2008, after a home defeat to Blackpool.

=== Colchester United ===
On 2 September 2009, Boothroyd was announced as the new manager of League One side Colchester United, succeeding Paul Lambert. In his first game as Colchester boss the team drew 0–0 with Southampton and the team won five of the first nine games in his charge. The first defeat came in his 10th game in a 2–1 defeat to Millwall.

His first signing as Colchester boss was the loan of John-Joe O'Toole and his first permanent signing was Kayode Odejayi. O'Toole was subsequently signed on a permanent basis and he also signed David Prutton from Leeds United, Ian Henderson from Ankaragücü and Morten Knudsen from Norway. Boothroyd added another loan signing with Franck Queudrue arriving on loan from Birmingham City.

Colchester, under Boothroyd, were in the top 6 for over half of the campaign. However, a poor run of form towards the end of the season which saw them win only 2 games of their last 14 games, and this saw them drop just outside the play-offs and finish in 8th position in League One. On 20 May 2010, Boothroyd left the club to take over Championship side Coventry City.

=== Coventry City ===
On 20 May 2010, Boothroyd was announced as the new manager of Championship side Coventry City, succeeding Chris Coleman. His first game in charge was on 7 August, in which Boothroyd led Coventry City to an opening day victory over Portsmouth with both goals from Freddy Eastwood.

On 14 March 2011, Boothroyd was sacked by Coventry City after a run of poor results, which saw the club win only once in sixteen league games.

=== Northampton Town ===
Boothroyd was appointed as manager of Northampton Town on 30 November 2011 on a one-year, rolling contract. Northampton had slipped to the foot of the League Two table, and six points from safety, before Boothroyd guided them to a 20th-place finish in the 2011–12 season. In the 2012–13 season, Northampton finished 6th, making the playoffs with 73 points. They beat Cheltenham Town 2-0 (on aggregate) in the two-legged semi-finals before losing 3–0 to Bradford City in the final at Wembley on 18 May 2013. On 21 December 2013, Boothroyd was sacked by Northampton after a 4–1 defeat by Wycombe Wanderers. The club were bottom of League Two.

=== England youth teams ===
On 28 February 2014, Boothroyd was appointed manager of the England national under-20 football team, but was replaced the following year in a reshuffle that saw him coach the under-19 side instead. He was re-appointed under-20s manager in August 2016, with Keith Downing taking charge of the under-19s.

Boothroyd was named caretaker manager of the England national under-21 football team, after Gareth Southgate was named interim manager of the senior team. He would manage the side for their remaining 2017 UEFA Euro Championship qualifiers against Kazakhstan and Bosnia and Herzegovina. His first match in charge of the under-21s ended in a 1–0 win over Kazakhstan, and the second, a 5–0 win over Bosnia and Herzegovina.

On 9 June 2018, Boothroyd managed England to success at the 2018 Toulon Tournament, beating Mexico 2–1 in the final.

On 16 April 2021, Boothroyd announced he would leave his role with The FA to focus on a return to club football.

=== Northern Ireland ===
On 17 May 2022 it was confirmed that Boothroyd would join Northern Ireland's coaching staff on a short-term basis due to the absence of Adam Sadler.

=== Jamshedpur ===
On 10 July 2022, Boothroyd was appointed as head coach of Jamshedpur. He said: "Jamshedpur FC are the Champions of India currently and the city has a tremendous football legacy. We want to continue this upward trajectory and make the club reach places and win honours that our fans are dreaming of. We want to take the club to the next level and to compete really with the top teams of Asia."

== Personal life ==
On 26 March 2025, Boothroyd publicly revealed that he had been diagnosed with Parkinson's disease in November 2021 during a routine health check.

== Managerial statistics ==
As of 18 April 2023

Managerial record by team and tenure
Team	From	To	Record					Ref
Team	From	To	P	W	D	L	Win %	Ref
Watford	29 March 2005	3 November 2008	176	65	51	60	36.9	
Colchester United	2 September 2009	20 May 2010	44	19	12	13	43.2	
Coventry City	20 May 2010	14 March 2011	39	12	8	19	30.8	
Northampton Town	30 November 2011	21 December 2013	108	39	26	43	36.1	
England U21	28 September 2016	16 April 2021	48	31	8	9	64.6	
Jamshedpur	10 July 2022	31 May 2023	24	8	4	12	33.33	
Total			439	174	109	156	39.6	

== Honours ==
=== Managerial ===
Watford

- Football League Championship play-offs: 2006

England U21

- Toulon Tournament: 2018
